

516001–516100 

|-bgcolor=#E9E9E9
| 516001 ||  || — || February 3, 2013 || Haleakala || Pan-STARRS ||  || align=right | 1.1 km || 
|-id=002 bgcolor=#E9E9E9
| 516002 ||  || — || October 25, 2011 || Haleakala || Pan-STARRS ||  || align=right | 1.8 km || 
|-id=003 bgcolor=#d6d6d6
| 516003 ||  || — || October 1, 2005 || Mount Lemmon || Mount Lemmon Survey ||  || align=right | 2.2 km || 
|-id=004 bgcolor=#E9E9E9
| 516004 ||  || — || April 5, 2005 || Mount Lemmon || Mount Lemmon Survey ||  || align=right | 1.7 km || 
|-id=005 bgcolor=#d6d6d6
| 516005 ||  || — || September 29, 2005 || Mount Lemmon || Mount Lemmon Survey ||  || align=right | 2.1 km || 
|-id=006 bgcolor=#d6d6d6
| 516006 ||  || — || October 7, 2005 || Mount Lemmon || Mount Lemmon Survey ||  || align=right | 2.1 km || 
|-id=007 bgcolor=#d6d6d6
| 516007 ||  || — || December 24, 2006 || Mount Lemmon || Mount Lemmon Survey ||  || align=right | 2.4 km || 
|-id=008 bgcolor=#d6d6d6
| 516008 ||  || — || October 31, 2010 || Kitt Peak || Spacewatch ||  || align=right | 2.4 km || 
|-id=009 bgcolor=#d6d6d6
| 516009 ||  || — || January 21, 2012 || Kitt Peak || Spacewatch ||  || align=right | 2.2 km || 
|-id=010 bgcolor=#d6d6d6
| 516010 ||  || — || October 20, 2006 || Mount Lemmon || Mount Lemmon Survey ||  || align=right | 2.6 km || 
|-id=011 bgcolor=#E9E9E9
| 516011 ||  || — || October 26, 2011 || Haleakala || Pan-STARRS ||  || align=right | 1.9 km || 
|-id=012 bgcolor=#d6d6d6
| 516012 ||  || — || March 9, 2007 || Mount Lemmon || Mount Lemmon Survey ||  || align=right | 2.4 km || 
|-id=013 bgcolor=#d6d6d6
| 516013 ||  || — || February 21, 2007 || Kitt Peak || Spacewatch ||  || align=right | 2.9 km || 
|-id=014 bgcolor=#E9E9E9
| 516014 ||  || — || October 1, 2006 || Kitt Peak || Spacewatch ||  || align=right | 1.7 km || 
|-id=015 bgcolor=#d6d6d6
| 516015 ||  || — || March 11, 2007 || Mount Lemmon || Mount Lemmon Survey ||  || align=right | 3.6 km || 
|-id=016 bgcolor=#E9E9E9
| 516016 ||  || — || January 10, 2013 || Haleakala || Pan-STARRS ||  || align=right | 1.4 km || 
|-id=017 bgcolor=#d6d6d6
| 516017 ||  || — || February 11, 2008 || Mount Lemmon || Mount Lemmon Survey ||  || align=right | 2.4 km || 
|-id=018 bgcolor=#E9E9E9
| 516018 ||  || — || September 19, 2006 || Kitt Peak || Spacewatch ||  || align=right | 1.9 km || 
|-id=019 bgcolor=#d6d6d6
| 516019 ||  || — || March 10, 2008 || Mount Lemmon || Mount Lemmon Survey ||  || align=right | 3.3 km || 
|-id=020 bgcolor=#d6d6d6
| 516020 ||  || — || June 1, 2010 || WISE || WISE ||  || align=right | 2.3 km || 
|-id=021 bgcolor=#d6d6d6
| 516021 ||  || — || August 19, 2009 || La Sagra || OAM Obs. ||  || align=right | 4.0 km || 
|-id=022 bgcolor=#d6d6d6
| 516022 ||  || — || January 20, 2012 || Mount Lemmon || Mount Lemmon Survey ||  || align=right | 3.1 km || 
|-id=023 bgcolor=#d6d6d6
| 516023 ||  || — || April 14, 2008 || Mount Lemmon || Mount Lemmon Survey ||  || align=right | 3.3 km || 
|-id=024 bgcolor=#d6d6d6
| 516024 ||  || — || September 24, 2009 || Catalina || CSS ||  || align=right | 3.6 km || 
|-id=025 bgcolor=#E9E9E9
| 516025 ||  || — || April 2, 2005 || Mount Lemmon || Mount Lemmon Survey ||  || align=right | 1.7 km || 
|-id=026 bgcolor=#E9E9E9
| 516026 ||  || — || May 3, 2005 || Kitt Peak || Spacewatch ||  || align=right | 1.6 km || 
|-id=027 bgcolor=#E9E9E9
| 516027 ||  || — || September 25, 2006 || Mount Lemmon || Mount Lemmon Survey ||  || align=right | 2.1 km || 
|-id=028 bgcolor=#d6d6d6
| 516028 ||  || — || July 2, 2014 || Haleakala || Pan-STARRS ||  || align=right | 2.5 km || 
|-id=029 bgcolor=#E9E9E9
| 516029 ||  || — || April 27, 2009 || Mount Lemmon || Mount Lemmon Survey ||  || align=right | 1.9 km || 
|-id=030 bgcolor=#d6d6d6
| 516030 ||  || — || May 3, 2008 || Mount Lemmon || Mount Lemmon Survey ||  || align=right | 2.5 km || 
|-id=031 bgcolor=#d6d6d6
| 516031 ||  || — || May 16, 2013 || Mount Lemmon || Mount Lemmon Survey ||  || align=right | 2.9 km || 
|-id=032 bgcolor=#E9E9E9
| 516032 ||  || — || January 11, 2008 || Mount Lemmon || Mount Lemmon Survey ||  || align=right | 2.1 km || 
|-id=033 bgcolor=#E9E9E9
| 516033 ||  || — || September 30, 2006 || Kitt Peak || Spacewatch ||  || align=right | 2.4 km || 
|-id=034 bgcolor=#fefefe
| 516034 ||  || — || July 19, 2004 || Anderson Mesa || LONEOS ||  || align=right data-sort-value="0.90" | 900 m || 
|-id=035 bgcolor=#d6d6d6
| 516035 ||  || — || October 11, 2010 || Catalina || CSS ||  || align=right | 3.6 km || 
|-id=036 bgcolor=#E9E9E9
| 516036 ||  || — || November 24, 2011 || Haleakala || Pan-STARRS ||  || align=right | 2.0 km || 
|-id=037 bgcolor=#E9E9E9
| 516037 ||  || — || September 19, 2006 || Catalina || CSS ||  || align=right | 2.1 km || 
|-id=038 bgcolor=#d6d6d6
| 516038 ||  || — || October 29, 2010 || Mount Lemmon || Mount Lemmon Survey ||  || align=right | 2.5 km || 
|-id=039 bgcolor=#d6d6d6
| 516039 ||  || — || July 24, 2009 || Siding Spring || SSS ||  || align=right | 2.0 km || 
|-id=040 bgcolor=#d6d6d6
| 516040 ||  || — || November 14, 2010 || Mount Lemmon || Mount Lemmon Survey ||  || align=right | 2.8 km || 
|-id=041 bgcolor=#d6d6d6
| 516041 ||  || — || August 22, 1998 || Xinglong || SCAP ||  || align=right | 3.1 km || 
|-id=042 bgcolor=#d6d6d6
| 516042 ||  || — || August 15, 2009 || Kitt Peak || Spacewatch ||  || align=right | 3.4 km || 
|-id=043 bgcolor=#d6d6d6
| 516043 ||  || — || May 15, 2013 || Haleakala || Pan-STARRS || VER || align=right | 2.3 km || 
|-id=044 bgcolor=#d6d6d6
| 516044 ||  || — || April 25, 2007 || Kitt Peak || Spacewatch || VER || align=right | 2.7 km || 
|-id=045 bgcolor=#d6d6d6
| 516045 ||  || — || March 11, 2007 || Kitt Peak || Spacewatch ||  || align=right | 2.8 km || 
|-id=046 bgcolor=#d6d6d6
| 516046 ||  || — || June 28, 2014 || Haleakala || Pan-STARRS ||  || align=right | 2.5 km || 
|-id=047 bgcolor=#d6d6d6
| 516047 ||  || — || December 5, 2010 || Kitt Peak || Spacewatch || VER || align=right | 2.6 km || 
|-id=048 bgcolor=#d6d6d6
| 516048 ||  || — || May 16, 2013 || Haleakala || Pan-STARRS ||  || align=right | 3.0 km || 
|-id=049 bgcolor=#d6d6d6
| 516049 ||  || — || December 25, 2005 || Kitt Peak || Spacewatch || EOS || align=right | 1.9 km || 
|-id=050 bgcolor=#d6d6d6
| 516050 ||  || — || February 23, 2012 || Mount Lemmon || Mount Lemmon Survey ||  || align=right | 2.6 km || 
|-id=051 bgcolor=#d6d6d6
| 516051 ||  || — || September 11, 2014 || Haleakala || Pan-STARRS ||  || align=right | 3.0 km || 
|-id=052 bgcolor=#d6d6d6
| 516052 ||  || — || February 2, 2008 || Kitt Peak || Spacewatch ||  || align=right | 2.6 km || 
|-id=053 bgcolor=#d6d6d6
| 516053 ||  || — || February 6, 2013 || Kitt Peak || Spacewatch ||  || align=right | 2.1 km || 
|-id=054 bgcolor=#d6d6d6
| 516054 ||  || — || February 13, 2008 || Kitt Peak || Spacewatch || KOR || align=right | 1.1 km || 
|-id=055 bgcolor=#E9E9E9
| 516055 ||  || — || October 22, 2006 || Mount Lemmon || Mount Lemmon Survey || HOF || align=right | 2.3 km || 
|-id=056 bgcolor=#fefefe
| 516056 ||  || — || July 30, 2011 || Siding Spring || SSS ||  || align=right data-sort-value="0.90" | 900 m || 
|-id=057 bgcolor=#d6d6d6
| 516057 ||  || — || January 25, 2012 || Haleakala || Pan-STARRS || NAE || align=right | 2.6 km || 
|-id=058 bgcolor=#d6d6d6
| 516058 ||  || — || March 26, 2007 || Mount Lemmon || Mount Lemmon Survey ||  || align=right | 3.0 km || 
|-id=059 bgcolor=#d6d6d6
| 516059 ||  || — || September 3, 2010 || Mount Lemmon || Mount Lemmon Survey || EOS || align=right | 1.9 km || 
|-id=060 bgcolor=#fefefe
| 516060 ||  || — || February 28, 2014 || Haleakala || Pan-STARRS ||  || align=right data-sort-value="0.89" | 890 m || 
|-id=061 bgcolor=#d6d6d6
| 516061 ||  || — || October 1, 2005 || Catalina || CSS ||  || align=right | 3.7 km || 
|-id=062 bgcolor=#d6d6d6
| 516062 ||  || — || September 17, 2010 || Mount Lemmon || Mount Lemmon Survey ||  || align=right | 2.5 km || 
|-id=063 bgcolor=#d6d6d6
| 516063 ||  || — || March 13, 2007 || Mount Lemmon || Mount Lemmon Survey || EOS || align=right | 1.9 km || 
|-id=064 bgcolor=#d6d6d6
| 516064 ||  || — || April 13, 2013 || Kitt Peak || Spacewatch ||  || align=right | 3.9 km || 
|-id=065 bgcolor=#d6d6d6
| 516065 ||  || — || December 26, 2005 || Mount Lemmon || Mount Lemmon Survey ||  || align=right | 2.3 km || 
|-id=066 bgcolor=#d6d6d6
| 516066 ||  || — || November 27, 2010 || Mount Lemmon || Mount Lemmon Survey ||  || align=right | 3.0 km || 
|-id=067 bgcolor=#E9E9E9
| 516067 ||  || — || August 28, 2006 || Kitt Peak || Spacewatch ||  || align=right | 2.0 km || 
|-id=068 bgcolor=#fefefe
| 516068 ||  || — || February 3, 2006 || Kitt Peak || Spacewatch ||  || align=right data-sort-value="0.89" | 890 m || 
|-id=069 bgcolor=#d6d6d6
| 516069 ||  || — || July 19, 2007 || Mount Lemmon || Mount Lemmon Survey || 7:4 || align=right | 5.0 km || 
|-id=070 bgcolor=#d6d6d6
| 516070 ||  || — || August 8, 2010 || WISE || WISE ||  || align=right | 3.0 km || 
|-id=071 bgcolor=#d6d6d6
| 516071 ||  || — || March 16, 2013 || Mount Lemmon || Mount Lemmon Survey ||  || align=right | 2.9 km || 
|-id=072 bgcolor=#E9E9E9
| 516072 ||  || — || October 24, 2011 || Haleakala || Pan-STARRS ||  || align=right | 1.7 km || 
|-id=073 bgcolor=#d6d6d6
| 516073 ||  || — || November 2, 2010 || Mount Lemmon || Mount Lemmon Survey || EOS || align=right | 1.6 km || 
|-id=074 bgcolor=#d6d6d6
| 516074 ||  || — || September 5, 2010 || Mount Lemmon || Mount Lemmon Survey ||  || align=right | 2.7 km || 
|-id=075 bgcolor=#d6d6d6
| 516075 ||  || — || December 30, 2005 || Kitt Peak || Spacewatch ||  || align=right | 2.9 km || 
|-id=076 bgcolor=#d6d6d6
| 516076 ||  || — || March 12, 2007 || Kitt Peak || Spacewatch || VER || align=right | 2.6 km || 
|-id=077 bgcolor=#E9E9E9
| 516077 ||  || — || October 10, 2015 || Kitt Peak || Spacewatch || HOF || align=right | 2.3 km || 
|-id=078 bgcolor=#d6d6d6
| 516078 ||  || — || April 4, 2008 || Kitt Peak || Spacewatch || EOS || align=right | 2.0 km || 
|-id=079 bgcolor=#d6d6d6
| 516079 ||  || — || August 16, 1993 || Kitt Peak || Spacewatch ||  || align=right | 2.9 km || 
|-id=080 bgcolor=#d6d6d6
| 516080 ||  || — || August 30, 2000 || Kitt Peak || Spacewatch || KOR || align=right | 1.3 km || 
|-id=081 bgcolor=#d6d6d6
| 516081 ||  || — || October 8, 2005 || Kitt Peak || Spacewatch || KOR || align=right | 1.3 km || 
|-id=082 bgcolor=#d6d6d6
| 516082 ||  || — || February 19, 2012 || Kitt Peak || Spacewatch ||  || align=right | 3.3 km || 
|-id=083 bgcolor=#d6d6d6
| 516083 ||  || — || August 3, 2014 || Haleakala || Pan-STARRS || EOS || align=right | 2.2 km || 
|-id=084 bgcolor=#d6d6d6
| 516084 ||  || — || April 20, 2013 || Mount Lemmon || Mount Lemmon Survey ||  || align=right | 3.1 km || 
|-id=085 bgcolor=#d6d6d6
| 516085 ||  || — || January 30, 2012 || Mount Lemmon || Mount Lemmon Survey ||  || align=right | 2.6 km || 
|-id=086 bgcolor=#E9E9E9
| 516086 ||  || — || September 27, 2006 || Kitt Peak || Spacewatch ||  || align=right | 1.9 km || 
|-id=087 bgcolor=#d6d6d6
| 516087 ||  || — || March 15, 2007 || Kitt Peak || Spacewatch ||  || align=right | 3.1 km || 
|-id=088 bgcolor=#d6d6d6
| 516088 ||  || — || November 18, 1998 || Kitt Peak || Spacewatch ||  || align=right | 3.1 km || 
|-id=089 bgcolor=#d6d6d6
| 516089 ||  || — || April 11, 2008 || Mount Lemmon || Mount Lemmon Survey ||  || align=right | 2.6 km || 
|-id=090 bgcolor=#E9E9E9
| 516090 ||  || — || October 23, 2011 || Haleakala || Pan-STARRS ||  || align=right | 2.1 km || 
|-id=091 bgcolor=#d6d6d6
| 516091 ||  || — || October 17, 2010 || Mount Lemmon || Mount Lemmon Survey ||  || align=right | 3.3 km || 
|-id=092 bgcolor=#d6d6d6
| 516092 ||  || — || March 13, 2007 || Mount Lemmon || Mount Lemmon Survey ||  || align=right | 2.6 km || 
|-id=093 bgcolor=#d6d6d6
| 516093 ||  || — || August 3, 2014 || Haleakala || Pan-STARRS ||  || align=right | 2.6 km || 
|-id=094 bgcolor=#d6d6d6
| 516094 ||  || — || April 25, 2007 || Mount Lemmon || Mount Lemmon Survey ||  || align=right | 2.9 km || 
|-id=095 bgcolor=#d6d6d6
| 516095 ||  || — || April 11, 2007 || Mount Lemmon || Mount Lemmon Survey ||  || align=right | 2.8 km || 
|-id=096 bgcolor=#d6d6d6
| 516096 ||  || — || March 14, 2007 || Mount Lemmon || Mount Lemmon Survey ||  || align=right | 2.9 km || 
|-id=097 bgcolor=#d6d6d6
| 516097 ||  || — || March 14, 2007 || Kitt Peak || Spacewatch ||  || align=right | 2.9 km || 
|-id=098 bgcolor=#d6d6d6
| 516098 ||  || — || April 10, 2013 || Haleakala || Pan-STARRS ||  || align=right | 2.7 km || 
|-id=099 bgcolor=#d6d6d6
| 516099 ||  || — || August 3, 2014 || Haleakala || Pan-STARRS || 7:4 || align=right | 2.7 km || 
|-id=100 bgcolor=#E9E9E9
| 516100 ||  || — || October 22, 2006 || Kitt Peak || Spacewatch ||  || align=right | 2.0 km || 
|}

516101–516200 

|-bgcolor=#d6d6d6
| 516101 ||  || — || August 20, 2009 || Kitt Peak || Spacewatch ||  || align=right | 2.8 km || 
|-id=102 bgcolor=#d6d6d6
| 516102 ||  || — || August 27, 2009 || Kitt Peak || Spacewatch ||  || align=right | 2.4 km || 
|-id=103 bgcolor=#E9E9E9
| 516103 ||  || — || October 18, 2011 || Mount Lemmon || Mount Lemmon Survey ||  || align=right | 1.5 km || 
|-id=104 bgcolor=#d6d6d6
| 516104 ||  || — || August 28, 2005 || Kitt Peak || Spacewatch ||  || align=right | 2.2 km || 
|-id=105 bgcolor=#d6d6d6
| 516105 ||  || — || March 13, 2013 || Kitt Peak || Spacewatch ||  || align=right | 2.4 km || 
|-id=106 bgcolor=#d6d6d6
| 516106 ||  || — || October 30, 2010 || Mount Lemmon || Mount Lemmon Survey ||  || align=right | 2.5 km || 
|-id=107 bgcolor=#E9E9E9
| 516107 ||  || — || October 12, 2007 || Kitt Peak || Spacewatch ||  || align=right data-sort-value="0.78" | 780 m || 
|-id=108 bgcolor=#d6d6d6
| 516108 ||  || — || August 22, 2014 || Haleakala || Pan-STARRS ||  || align=right | 2.4 km || 
|-id=109 bgcolor=#d6d6d6
| 516109 ||  || — || April 10, 2013 || Haleakala || Pan-STARRS ||  || align=right | 2.5 km || 
|-id=110 bgcolor=#d6d6d6
| 516110 ||  || — || October 30, 2010 || Mount Lemmon || Mount Lemmon Survey ||  || align=right | 2.5 km || 
|-id=111 bgcolor=#d6d6d6
| 516111 ||  || — || September 13, 2004 || Kitt Peak || Spacewatch ||  || align=right | 2.3 km || 
|-id=112 bgcolor=#d6d6d6
| 516112 ||  || — || April 7, 2008 || Kitt Peak || Spacewatch ||  || align=right | 2.2 km || 
|-id=113 bgcolor=#d6d6d6
| 516113 ||  || — || November 11, 2010 || Mount Lemmon || Mount Lemmon Survey ||  || align=right | 2.2 km || 
|-id=114 bgcolor=#fefefe
| 516114 ||  || — || September 5, 2007 || Mount Lemmon || Mount Lemmon Survey ||  || align=right data-sort-value="0.82" | 820 m || 
|-id=115 bgcolor=#d6d6d6
| 516115 ||  || — || May 15, 2013 || Haleakala || Pan-STARRS ||  || align=right | 3.0 km || 
|-id=116 bgcolor=#d6d6d6
| 516116 ||  || — || January 25, 2006 || Kitt Peak || Spacewatch ||  || align=right | 3.0 km || 
|-id=117 bgcolor=#d6d6d6
| 516117 ||  || — || January 26, 2012 || Mount Lemmon || Mount Lemmon Survey ||  || align=right | 2.7 km || 
|-id=118 bgcolor=#d6d6d6
| 516118 ||  || — || January 31, 2006 || Kitt Peak || Spacewatch ||  || align=right | 2.2 km || 
|-id=119 bgcolor=#d6d6d6
| 516119 ||  || — || August 18, 2009 || Kitt Peak || Spacewatch ||  || align=right | 2.6 km || 
|-id=120 bgcolor=#d6d6d6
| 516120 ||  || — || August 28, 2009 || Catalina || CSS ||  || align=right | 3.0 km || 
|-id=121 bgcolor=#d6d6d6
| 516121 ||  || — || August 30, 2005 || Kitt Peak || Spacewatch ||  || align=right | 1.8 km || 
|-id=122 bgcolor=#d6d6d6
| 516122 ||  || — || April 17, 2013 || Haleakala || Pan-STARRS ||  || align=right | 2.9 km || 
|-id=123 bgcolor=#E9E9E9
| 516123 ||  || — || October 26, 2011 || Haleakala || Pan-STARRS ||  || align=right | 1.2 km || 
|-id=124 bgcolor=#d6d6d6
| 516124 ||  || — || April 30, 2008 || Mount Lemmon || Mount Lemmon Survey ||  || align=right | 2.6 km || 
|-id=125 bgcolor=#E9E9E9
| 516125 ||  || — || September 17, 2010 || Mount Lemmon || Mount Lemmon Survey ||  || align=right | 2.2 km || 
|-id=126 bgcolor=#d6d6d6
| 516126 ||  || — || September 23, 2015 || Haleakala || Pan-STARRS ||  || align=right | 2.8 km || 
|-id=127 bgcolor=#d6d6d6
| 516127 ||  || — || April 7, 2008 || Kitt Peak || Spacewatch ||  || align=right | 2.9 km || 
|-id=128 bgcolor=#d6d6d6
| 516128 ||  || — || September 12, 2015 || Haleakala || Pan-STARRS ||  || align=right | 2.3 km || 
|-id=129 bgcolor=#d6d6d6
| 516129 ||  || — || April 10, 2013 || Haleakala || Pan-STARRS ||  || align=right | 3.4 km || 
|-id=130 bgcolor=#d6d6d6
| 516130 ||  || — || December 9, 2010 || Kitt Peak || Spacewatch ||  || align=right | 2.8 km || 
|-id=131 bgcolor=#d6d6d6
| 516131 ||  || — || June 8, 2014 || Haleakala || Pan-STARRS ||  || align=right | 2.9 km || 
|-id=132 bgcolor=#d6d6d6
| 516132 ||  || — || June 24, 2014 || Haleakala || Pan-STARRS ||  || align=right | 2.4 km || 
|-id=133 bgcolor=#d6d6d6
| 516133 ||  || — || July 29, 2014 || Haleakala || Pan-STARRS ||  || align=right | 3.3 km || 
|-id=134 bgcolor=#d6d6d6
| 516134 ||  || — || March 12, 2007 || Mount Lemmon || Mount Lemmon Survey ||  || align=right | 2.7 km || 
|-id=135 bgcolor=#d6d6d6
| 516135 ||  || — || March 16, 2013 || Mount Lemmon || Mount Lemmon Survey ||  || align=right | 3.3 km || 
|-id=136 bgcolor=#d6d6d6
| 516136 ||  || — || January 22, 2012 || Haleakala || Pan-STARRS ||  || align=right | 2.5 km || 
|-id=137 bgcolor=#d6d6d6
| 516137 ||  || — || October 18, 1998 || Kitt Peak || Spacewatch ||  || align=right | 2.9 km || 
|-id=138 bgcolor=#d6d6d6
| 516138 ||  || — || March 18, 2013 || Kitt Peak || Spacewatch ||  || align=right | 2.7 km || 
|-id=139 bgcolor=#d6d6d6
| 516139 ||  || — || December 2, 2010 || Kitt Peak || Spacewatch ||  || align=right | 3.2 km || 
|-id=140 bgcolor=#d6d6d6
| 516140 ||  || — || August 1, 2009 || Kitt Peak || Spacewatch ||  || align=right | 3.9 km || 
|-id=141 bgcolor=#d6d6d6
| 516141 ||  || — || November 29, 2005 || Kitt Peak || Spacewatch ||  || align=right | 2.8 km || 
|-id=142 bgcolor=#d6d6d6
| 516142 ||  || — || March 15, 2012 || Kitt Peak || Spacewatch ||  || align=right | 2.5 km || 
|-id=143 bgcolor=#d6d6d6
| 516143 ||  || — || October 16, 2009 || Mount Lemmon || Mount Lemmon Survey ||  || align=right | 2.9 km || 
|-id=144 bgcolor=#d6d6d6
| 516144 ||  || — || November 5, 2010 || Mount Lemmon || Mount Lemmon Survey ||  || align=right | 3.3 km || 
|-id=145 bgcolor=#d6d6d6
| 516145 ||  || — || September 24, 2009 || Kitt Peak || Spacewatch ||  || align=right | 2.5 km || 
|-id=146 bgcolor=#E9E9E9
| 516146 ||  || — || September 27, 2006 || Mount Lemmon || Mount Lemmon Survey ||  || align=right | 1.5 km || 
|-id=147 bgcolor=#d6d6d6
| 516147 ||  || — || May 17, 2013 || Mount Lemmon || Mount Lemmon Survey ||  || align=right | 2.8 km || 
|-id=148 bgcolor=#d6d6d6
| 516148 ||  || — || September 16, 2009 || Catalina || CSS ||  || align=right | 3.7 km || 
|-id=149 bgcolor=#d6d6d6
| 516149 ||  || — || January 10, 2006 || Kitt Peak || Spacewatch ||  || align=right | 3.2 km || 
|-id=150 bgcolor=#d6d6d6
| 516150 ||  || — || September 18, 2003 || Kitt Peak || Spacewatch ||  || align=right | 3.2 km || 
|-id=151 bgcolor=#d6d6d6
| 516151 ||  || — || October 28, 2005 || Mount Lemmon || Mount Lemmon Survey ||  || align=right | 2.8 km || 
|-id=152 bgcolor=#C2FFFF
| 516152 ||  || — || October 25, 2014 || Haleakala || Pan-STARRS || L5 || align=right | 10 km || 
|-id=153 bgcolor=#d6d6d6
| 516153 ||  || — || April 15, 2013 || Haleakala || Pan-STARRS ||  || align=right | 2.7 km || 
|-id=154 bgcolor=#FFC2E0
| 516154 ||  || — || February 6, 2016 || Catalina || CSS || APOPHA || align=right data-sort-value="0.47" | 470 m || 
|-id=155 bgcolor=#FFC2E0
| 516155 ||  || — || February 18, 2016 || Mount Lemmon || Mount Lemmon Survey || APOPHA || align=right data-sort-value="0.33" | 330 m || 
|-id=156 bgcolor=#d6d6d6
| 516156 ||  || — || September 24, 2008 || Mount Lemmon || Mount Lemmon Survey ||  || align=right | 2.4 km || 
|-id=157 bgcolor=#FA8072
| 516157 ||  || — || April 5, 2008 || Mount Lemmon || Mount Lemmon Survey || H || align=right data-sort-value="0.51" | 510 m || 
|-id=158 bgcolor=#FA8072
| 516158 ||  || — || March 8, 2013 || Haleakala || Pan-STARRS || H || align=right data-sort-value="0.60" | 600 m || 
|-id=159 bgcolor=#fefefe
| 516159 ||  || — || January 6, 2010 || Mount Lemmon || Mount Lemmon Survey || H || align=right data-sort-value="0.57" | 570 m || 
|-id=160 bgcolor=#fefefe
| 516160 ||  || — || August 30, 2014 || Catalina || CSS || H || align=right data-sort-value="0.51" | 510 m || 
|-id=161 bgcolor=#fefefe
| 516161 ||  || — || August 27, 2011 || Haleakala || Pan-STARRS || H || align=right data-sort-value="0.57" | 570 m || 
|-id=162 bgcolor=#fefefe
| 516162 ||  || — || September 15, 1998 || Kitt Peak || Spacewatch ||  || align=right data-sort-value="0.61" | 610 m || 
|-id=163 bgcolor=#d6d6d6
| 516163 ||  || — || August 31, 2005 || Campo Imperatore || CINEOS ||  || align=right | 3.2 km || 
|-id=164 bgcolor=#fefefe
| 516164 ||  || — || September 28, 2011 || Mount Lemmon || Mount Lemmon Survey || H || align=right data-sort-value="0.51" | 510 m || 
|-id=165 bgcolor=#E9E9E9
| 516165 ||  || — || February 10, 2014 || Haleakala || Pan-STARRS ||  || align=right | 1.1 km || 
|-id=166 bgcolor=#E9E9E9
| 516166 ||  || — || October 10, 2012 || Haleakala || Pan-STARRS ||  || align=right | 1.4 km || 
|-id=167 bgcolor=#fefefe
| 516167 ||  || — || October 16, 2009 || Catalina || CSS ||  || align=right data-sort-value="0.67" | 670 m || 
|-id=168 bgcolor=#fefefe
| 516168 ||  || — || August 14, 2012 || Haleakala || Pan-STARRS ||  || align=right data-sort-value="0.97" | 970 m || 
|-id=169 bgcolor=#fefefe
| 516169 ||  || — || October 20, 2003 || Socorro || LINEAR || H || align=right data-sort-value="0.80" | 800 m || 
|-id=170 bgcolor=#fefefe
| 516170 ||  || — || September 12, 2005 || Kitt Peak || Spacewatch || H || align=right data-sort-value="0.82" | 820 m || 
|-id=171 bgcolor=#fefefe
| 516171 ||  || — || January 15, 2015 || Haleakala || Pan-STARRS || H || align=right data-sort-value="0.59" | 590 m || 
|-id=172 bgcolor=#fefefe
| 516172 ||  || — || September 25, 2005 || Kitt Peak || Spacewatch || H || align=right data-sort-value="0.68" | 680 m || 
|-id=173 bgcolor=#fefefe
| 516173 ||  || — || February 9, 2007 || Kitt Peak || Spacewatch || H || align=right data-sort-value="0.68" | 680 m || 
|-id=174 bgcolor=#fefefe
| 516174 ||  || — || August 2, 2016 || Haleakala || Pan-STARRS ||  || align=right data-sort-value="0.70" | 700 m || 
|-id=175 bgcolor=#E9E9E9
| 516175 ||  || — || July 27, 2011 || Haleakala || Pan-STARRS ||  || align=right | 2.1 km || 
|-id=176 bgcolor=#E9E9E9
| 516176 ||  || — || November 19, 1995 || Kitt Peak || Spacewatch ||  || align=right | 1.1 km || 
|-id=177 bgcolor=#d6d6d6
| 516177 ||  || — || January 19, 2012 || Haleakala || Pan-STARRS ||  || align=right | 2.3 km || 
|-id=178 bgcolor=#E9E9E9
| 516178 ||  || — || August 14, 2016 || Haleakala || Pan-STARRS ||  || align=right | 1.3 km || 
|-id=179 bgcolor=#E9E9E9
| 516179 ||  || — || January 28, 2014 || Mount Lemmon || Mount Lemmon Survey ||  || align=right | 1.2 km || 
|-id=180 bgcolor=#fefefe
| 516180 ||  || — || August 28, 2005 || Anderson Mesa || LONEOS ||  || align=right data-sort-value="0.76" | 760 m || 
|-id=181 bgcolor=#fefefe
| 516181 ||  || — || August 26, 2005 || Anderson Mesa || LONEOS || H || align=right data-sort-value="0.52" | 520 m || 
|-id=182 bgcolor=#fefefe
| 516182 ||  || — || June 17, 2009 || Mount Lemmon || Mount Lemmon Survey ||  || align=right | 1.0 km || 
|-id=183 bgcolor=#fefefe
| 516183 ||  || — || August 28, 2009 || La Sagra || OAM Obs. ||  || align=right data-sort-value="0.75" | 750 m || 
|-id=184 bgcolor=#d6d6d6
| 516184 ||  || — || October 23, 2011 || Haleakala || Pan-STARRS ||  || align=right | 2.2 km || 
|-id=185 bgcolor=#E9E9E9
| 516185 ||  || — || December 9, 2012 || Mount Lemmon || Mount Lemmon Survey ||  || align=right | 2.5 km || 
|-id=186 bgcolor=#fefefe
| 516186 ||  || — || January 28, 2007 || Mount Lemmon || Mount Lemmon Survey ||  || align=right data-sort-value="0.84" | 840 m || 
|-id=187 bgcolor=#fefefe
| 516187 ||  || — || September 27, 2006 || Kitt Peak || Spacewatch ||  || align=right data-sort-value="0.68" | 680 m || 
|-id=188 bgcolor=#fefefe
| 516188 ||  || — || October 25, 2003 || Kitt Peak || Spacewatch ||  || align=right data-sort-value="0.67" | 670 m || 
|-id=189 bgcolor=#FA8072
| 516189 ||  || — || May 9, 2013 || Kitt Peak || Spacewatch || H || align=right data-sort-value="0.50" | 500 m || 
|-id=190 bgcolor=#fefefe
| 516190 ||  || — || September 28, 2008 || Catalina || CSS || H || align=right data-sort-value="0.68" | 680 m || 
|-id=191 bgcolor=#E9E9E9
| 516191 ||  || — || November 7, 2008 || Mount Lemmon || Mount Lemmon Survey ||  || align=right | 1.1 km || 
|-id=192 bgcolor=#E9E9E9
| 516192 ||  || — || December 21, 2003 || Kitt Peak || Spacewatch ||  || align=right | 1.5 km || 
|-id=193 bgcolor=#fefefe
| 516193 ||  || — || September 30, 2003 || Kitt Peak || Spacewatch ||  || align=right data-sort-value="0.74" | 740 m || 
|-id=194 bgcolor=#E9E9E9
| 516194 ||  || — || December 31, 2008 || Mount Lemmon || Mount Lemmon Survey ||  || align=right data-sort-value="0.87" | 870 m || 
|-id=195 bgcolor=#fefefe
| 516195 ||  || — || August 30, 2013 || Haleakala || Pan-STARRS || H || align=right data-sort-value="0.69" | 690 m || 
|-id=196 bgcolor=#d6d6d6
| 516196 ||  || — || September 26, 2005 || Kitt Peak || Spacewatch ||  || align=right | 2.4 km || 
|-id=197 bgcolor=#fefefe
| 516197 ||  || — || February 11, 2004 || Kitt Peak || Spacewatch ||  || align=right data-sort-value="0.77" | 770 m || 
|-id=198 bgcolor=#fefefe
| 516198 ||  || — || September 19, 2003 || Campo Imperatore || CINEOS ||  || align=right data-sort-value="0.77" | 770 m || 
|-id=199 bgcolor=#d6d6d6
| 516199 ||  || — || November 1, 2000 || Socorro || LINEAR ||  || align=right | 2.6 km || 
|-id=200 bgcolor=#E9E9E9
| 516200 ||  || — || October 6, 2008 || Mount Lemmon || Mount Lemmon Survey ||  || align=right data-sort-value="0.97" | 970 m || 
|}

516201–516300 

|-bgcolor=#E9E9E9
| 516201 ||  || — || November 27, 1995 || Kitt Peak || Spacewatch ||  || align=right | 1.5 km || 
|-id=202 bgcolor=#fefefe
| 516202 ||  || — || December 5, 2005 || Kitt Peak || Spacewatch ||  || align=right data-sort-value="0.75" | 750 m || 
|-id=203 bgcolor=#fefefe
| 516203 ||  || — || November 17, 2009 || Mount Lemmon || Mount Lemmon Survey ||  || align=right data-sort-value="0.75" | 750 m || 
|-id=204 bgcolor=#E9E9E9
| 516204 ||  || — || October 21, 2003 || Kitt Peak || Spacewatch ||  || align=right | 1.4 km || 
|-id=205 bgcolor=#fefefe
| 516205 ||  || — || December 27, 2006 || Mount Lemmon || Mount Lemmon Survey ||  || align=right data-sort-value="0.85" | 850 m || 
|-id=206 bgcolor=#d6d6d6
| 516206 ||  || — || September 20, 2011 || Catalina || CSS ||  || align=right | 2.4 km || 
|-id=207 bgcolor=#fefefe
| 516207 ||  || — || November 18, 1998 || Kitt Peak || Spacewatch || H || align=right data-sort-value="0.72" | 720 m || 
|-id=208 bgcolor=#d6d6d6
| 516208 ||  || — || October 12, 2005 || Kitt Peak || Spacewatch ||  || align=right | 2.5 km || 
|-id=209 bgcolor=#d6d6d6
| 516209 ||  || — || December 18, 2001 || Socorro || LINEAR ||  || align=right | 2.8 km || 
|-id=210 bgcolor=#fefefe
| 516210 ||  || — || October 23, 2006 || Kitt Peak || Spacewatch ||  || align=right data-sort-value="0.70" | 700 m || 
|-id=211 bgcolor=#fefefe
| 516211 ||  || — || September 27, 2003 || Kitt Peak || Spacewatch ||  || align=right data-sort-value="0.60" | 600 m || 
|-id=212 bgcolor=#E9E9E9
| 516212 ||  || — || April 11, 2010 || Kitt Peak || Spacewatch ||  || align=right | 2.4 km || 
|-id=213 bgcolor=#d6d6d6
| 516213 ||  || — || December 28, 2011 || Catalina || CSS ||  || align=right | 2.5 km || 
|-id=214 bgcolor=#E9E9E9
| 516214 ||  || — || October 17, 2012 || Mount Lemmon || Mount Lemmon Survey ||  || align=right | 1.3 km || 
|-id=215 bgcolor=#d6d6d6
| 516215 ||  || — || August 30, 2005 || Kitt Peak || Spacewatch ||  || align=right | 2.4 km || 
|-id=216 bgcolor=#fefefe
| 516216 ||  || — || October 17, 1995 || Kitt Peak || Spacewatch ||  || align=right data-sort-value="0.75" | 750 m || 
|-id=217 bgcolor=#E9E9E9
| 516217 ||  || — || October 19, 2012 || Catalina || CSS ||  || align=right | 1.1 km || 
|-id=218 bgcolor=#E9E9E9
| 516218 ||  || — || October 30, 2007 || Kitt Peak || Spacewatch ||  || align=right | 2.0 km || 
|-id=219 bgcolor=#E9E9E9
| 516219 ||  || — || December 10, 2012 || Haleakala || Pan-STARRS ||  || align=right | 1.1 km || 
|-id=220 bgcolor=#d6d6d6
| 516220 ||  || — || November 21, 2005 || Catalina || CSS ||  || align=right | 3.7 km || 
|-id=221 bgcolor=#d6d6d6
| 516221 ||  || — || March 28, 2008 || Mount Lemmon || Mount Lemmon Survey ||  || align=right | 2.6 km || 
|-id=222 bgcolor=#fefefe
| 516222 ||  || — || October 2, 2006 || Mount Lemmon || Mount Lemmon Survey ||  || align=right data-sort-value="0.60" | 600 m || 
|-id=223 bgcolor=#E9E9E9
| 516223 ||  || — || October 18, 2003 || Kitt Peak || Spacewatch ||  || align=right | 1.2 km || 
|-id=224 bgcolor=#fefefe
| 516224 ||  || — || February 25, 2014 || Kitt Peak || Spacewatch ||  || align=right data-sort-value="0.89" | 890 m || 
|-id=225 bgcolor=#E9E9E9
| 516225 ||  || — || December 30, 2007 || Mount Lemmon || Mount Lemmon Survey ||  || align=right | 2.2 km || 
|-id=226 bgcolor=#E9E9E9
| 516226 ||  || — || November 19, 2003 || Kitt Peak || Spacewatch ||  || align=right | 1.1 km || 
|-id=227 bgcolor=#E9E9E9
| 516227 ||  || — || November 9, 2007 || Mount Lemmon || Mount Lemmon Survey ||  || align=right | 1.8 km || 
|-id=228 bgcolor=#E9E9E9
| 516228 ||  || — || October 22, 2008 || Kitt Peak || Spacewatch ||  || align=right data-sort-value="0.94" | 940 m || 
|-id=229 bgcolor=#fefefe
| 516229 ||  || — || September 19, 2006 || Kitt Peak || Spacewatch ||  || align=right data-sort-value="0.69" | 690 m || 
|-id=230 bgcolor=#fefefe
| 516230 ||  || — || November 23, 2006 || Mount Lemmon || Mount Lemmon Survey ||  || align=right data-sort-value="0.81" | 810 m || 
|-id=231 bgcolor=#E9E9E9
| 516231 ||  || — || September 13, 2007 || Mount Lemmon || Mount Lemmon Survey ||  || align=right | 1.2 km || 
|-id=232 bgcolor=#E9E9E9
| 516232 ||  || — || June 12, 2015 || Mount Lemmon || Mount Lemmon Survey ||  || align=right | 2.4 km || 
|-id=233 bgcolor=#d6d6d6
| 516233 ||  || — || August 29, 2016 || Mount Lemmon || Mount Lemmon Survey ||  || align=right | 2.7 km || 
|-id=234 bgcolor=#d6d6d6
| 516234 ||  || — || November 16, 2011 || Mount Lemmon || Mount Lemmon Survey ||  || align=right | 2.3 km || 
|-id=235 bgcolor=#E9E9E9
| 516235 ||  || — || November 30, 2003 || Kitt Peak || Spacewatch ||  || align=right | 1.3 km || 
|-id=236 bgcolor=#fefefe
| 516236 ||  || — || January 7, 2006 || Kitt Peak || Spacewatch ||  || align=right data-sort-value="0.76" | 760 m || 
|-id=237 bgcolor=#FA8072
| 516237 ||  || — || September 25, 2000 || Socorro || LINEAR ||  || align=right data-sort-value="0.82" | 820 m || 
|-id=238 bgcolor=#d6d6d6
| 516238 ||  || — || March 16, 2007 || Kitt Peak || Spacewatch ||  || align=right | 2.9 km || 
|-id=239 bgcolor=#d6d6d6
| 516239 ||  || — || May 3, 2008 || Mount Lemmon || Mount Lemmon Survey ||  || align=right | 3.2 km || 
|-id=240 bgcolor=#fefefe
| 516240 ||  || — || December 19, 2000 || Kitt Peak || Spacewatch ||  || align=right data-sort-value="0.98" | 980 m || 
|-id=241 bgcolor=#E9E9E9
| 516241 ||  || — || December 14, 2013 || Haleakala || Pan-STARRS ||  || align=right data-sort-value="0.80" | 800 m || 
|-id=242 bgcolor=#E9E9E9
| 516242 ||  || — || October 22, 1995 || Kitt Peak || Spacewatch ||  || align=right data-sort-value="0.85" | 850 m || 
|-id=243 bgcolor=#E9E9E9
| 516243 ||  || — || February 28, 2014 || Haleakala || Pan-STARRS ||  || align=right | 2.1 km || 
|-id=244 bgcolor=#E9E9E9
| 516244 ||  || — || April 5, 2014 || Haleakala || Pan-STARRS ||  || align=right | 1.2 km || 
|-id=245 bgcolor=#d6d6d6
| 516245 ||  || — || August 29, 2005 || Kitt Peak || Spacewatch ||  || align=right | 3.3 km || 
|-id=246 bgcolor=#E9E9E9
| 516246 ||  || — || March 25, 2014 || Kitt Peak || Spacewatch ||  || align=right | 1.6 km || 
|-id=247 bgcolor=#fefefe
| 516247 ||  || — || March 10, 2007 || Mount Lemmon || Mount Lemmon Survey ||  || align=right data-sort-value="0.68" | 680 m || 
|-id=248 bgcolor=#E9E9E9
| 516248 ||  || — || September 22, 2003 || Kitt Peak || Spacewatch ||  || align=right | 1.4 km || 
|-id=249 bgcolor=#fefefe
| 516249 ||  || — || March 16, 2004 || Kitt Peak || Spacewatch ||  || align=right data-sort-value="0.67" | 670 m || 
|-id=250 bgcolor=#E9E9E9
| 516250 ||  || — || October 23, 2003 || Kitt Peak || Spacewatch ||  || align=right | 1.2 km || 
|-id=251 bgcolor=#E9E9E9
| 516251 ||  || — || October 15, 2007 || Mount Lemmon || Mount Lemmon Survey ||  || align=right | 1.4 km || 
|-id=252 bgcolor=#d6d6d6
| 516252 ||  || — || September 15, 2006 || Kitt Peak || Spacewatch ||  || align=right | 1.5 km || 
|-id=253 bgcolor=#E9E9E9
| 516253 ||  || — || October 22, 2012 || Haleakala || Pan-STARRS || fast || align=right data-sort-value="0.94" | 940 m || 
|-id=254 bgcolor=#E9E9E9
| 516254 ||  || — || September 5, 1999 || Kitt Peak || Spacewatch ||  || align=right data-sort-value="0.96" | 960 m || 
|-id=255 bgcolor=#fefefe
| 516255 ||  || — || January 6, 2010 || Kitt Peak || Spacewatch || V || align=right data-sort-value="0.74" | 740 m || 
|-id=256 bgcolor=#fefefe
| 516256 ||  || — || April 27, 2012 || Haleakala || Pan-STARRS ||  || align=right data-sort-value="0.59" | 590 m || 
|-id=257 bgcolor=#fefefe
| 516257 ||  || — || February 1, 2005 || Kitt Peak || Spacewatch ||  || align=right data-sort-value="0.71" | 710 m || 
|-id=258 bgcolor=#E9E9E9
| 516258 ||  || — || October 14, 2007 || Catalina || CSS ||  || align=right | 2.6 km || 
|-id=259 bgcolor=#d6d6d6
| 516259 ||  || — || May 29, 2009 || Mount Lemmon || Mount Lemmon Survey ||  || align=right | 2.7 km || 
|-id=260 bgcolor=#E9E9E9
| 516260 ||  || — || April 4, 2014 || Haleakala || Pan-STARRS ||  || align=right | 1.7 km || 
|-id=261 bgcolor=#E9E9E9
| 516261 ||  || — || February 9, 2014 || Mount Lemmon || Mount Lemmon Survey ||  || align=right | 1.2 km || 
|-id=262 bgcolor=#E9E9E9
| 516262 ||  || — || March 14, 2010 || Catalina || CSS ||  || align=right | 2.2 km || 
|-id=263 bgcolor=#E9E9E9
| 516263 ||  || — || April 30, 2014 || Haleakala || Pan-STARRS ||  || align=right | 1.0 km || 
|-id=264 bgcolor=#FA8072
| 516264 ||  || — || October 17, 2006 || Catalina || CSS ||  || align=right data-sort-value="0.84" | 840 m || 
|-id=265 bgcolor=#fefefe
| 516265 ||  || — || November 26, 2005 || Kitt Peak || Spacewatch ||  || align=right | 1.0 km || 
|-id=266 bgcolor=#fefefe
| 516266 ||  || — || October 24, 2005 || Kitt Peak || Spacewatch ||  || align=right data-sort-value="0.98" | 980 m || 
|-id=267 bgcolor=#d6d6d6
| 516267 ||  || — || September 19, 2006 || Kitt Peak || Spacewatch ||  || align=right | 1.9 km || 
|-id=268 bgcolor=#d6d6d6
| 516268 ||  || — || September 24, 2011 || Haleakala || Pan-STARRS ||  || align=right | 1.9 km || 
|-id=269 bgcolor=#E9E9E9
| 516269 ||  || — || February 20, 2014 || Mount Lemmon || Mount Lemmon Survey ||  || align=right | 1.2 km || 
|-id=270 bgcolor=#E9E9E9
| 516270 ||  || — || October 27, 2012 || Mount Lemmon || Mount Lemmon Survey ||  || align=right | 1.4 km || 
|-id=271 bgcolor=#E9E9E9
| 516271 ||  || — || January 5, 2013 || Mount Lemmon || Mount Lemmon Survey ||  || align=right data-sort-value="0.81" | 810 m || 
|-id=272 bgcolor=#d6d6d6
| 516272 ||  || — || June 11, 2010 || WISE || WISE ||  || align=right | 4.1 km || 
|-id=273 bgcolor=#E9E9E9
| 516273 ||  || — || October 23, 2003 || Kitt Peak || Spacewatch ||  || align=right | 1.2 km || 
|-id=274 bgcolor=#fefefe
| 516274 ||  || — || March 10, 2007 || Kitt Peak || Spacewatch ||  || align=right data-sort-value="0.64" | 640 m || 
|-id=275 bgcolor=#E9E9E9
| 516275 ||  || — || March 12, 2014 || Haleakala || Pan-STARRS ||  || align=right | 1.6 km || 
|-id=276 bgcolor=#fefefe
| 516276 ||  || — || March 27, 2011 || Mount Lemmon || Mount Lemmon Survey ||  || align=right data-sort-value="0.84" | 840 m || 
|-id=277 bgcolor=#fefefe
| 516277 ||  || — || February 21, 2007 || Kitt Peak || Spacewatch ||  || align=right data-sort-value="0.86" | 860 m || 
|-id=278 bgcolor=#d6d6d6
| 516278 ||  || — || October 26, 2011 || Haleakala || Pan-STARRS ||  || align=right | 2.0 km || 
|-id=279 bgcolor=#fefefe
| 516279 ||  || — || October 2, 2008 || Catalina || CSS ||  || align=right data-sort-value="0.94" | 940 m || 
|-id=280 bgcolor=#d6d6d6
| 516280 ||  || — || March 4, 2013 || Haleakala || Pan-STARRS ||  || align=right | 3.0 km || 
|-id=281 bgcolor=#d6d6d6
| 516281 ||  || — || September 30, 2006 || Mount Lemmon || Mount Lemmon Survey ||  || align=right | 1.8 km || 
|-id=282 bgcolor=#fefefe
| 516282 ||  || — || October 4, 2005 || Mount Lemmon || Mount Lemmon Survey ||  || align=right data-sort-value="0.87" | 870 m || 
|-id=283 bgcolor=#d6d6d6
| 516283 ||  || — || October 2, 2010 || Kitt Peak || Spacewatch ||  || align=right | 2.2 km || 
|-id=284 bgcolor=#E9E9E9
| 516284 ||  || — || December 13, 2004 || Kitt Peak || Spacewatch ||  || align=right | 1.1 km || 
|-id=285 bgcolor=#d6d6d6
| 516285 ||  || — || May 2, 2014 || Kitt Peak || Spacewatch ||  || align=right | 2.5 km || 
|-id=286 bgcolor=#d6d6d6
| 516286 ||  || — || January 18, 2012 || Mount Lemmon || Mount Lemmon Survey ||  || align=right | 2.5 km || 
|-id=287 bgcolor=#E9E9E9
| 516287 ||  || — || April 5, 2014 || Haleakala || Pan-STARRS ||  || align=right | 1.3 km || 
|-id=288 bgcolor=#E9E9E9
| 516288 ||  || — || May 7, 2014 || Haleakala || Pan-STARRS ||  || align=right data-sort-value="0.87" | 870 m || 
|-id=289 bgcolor=#E9E9E9
| 516289 ||  || — || April 20, 2006 || Kitt Peak || Spacewatch ||  || align=right | 2.7 km || 
|-id=290 bgcolor=#d6d6d6
| 516290 ||  || — || September 11, 2010 || Mount Lemmon || Mount Lemmon Survey ||  || align=right | 2.9 km || 
|-id=291 bgcolor=#E9E9E9
| 516291 ||  || — || November 17, 1998 || Kitt Peak || Spacewatch ||  || align=right | 1.9 km || 
|-id=292 bgcolor=#d6d6d6
| 516292 ||  || — || November 18, 2006 || Mount Lemmon || Mount Lemmon Survey ||  || align=right | 2.7 km || 
|-id=293 bgcolor=#fefefe
| 516293 ||  || — || November 18, 2003 || Kitt Peak || Spacewatch ||  || align=right data-sort-value="0.60" | 600 m || 
|-id=294 bgcolor=#E9E9E9
| 516294 ||  || — || September 11, 2007 || Mount Lemmon || Mount Lemmon Survey ||  || align=right | 1.3 km || 
|-id=295 bgcolor=#E9E9E9
| 516295 ||  || — || December 13, 2004 || Kitt Peak || Spacewatch ||  || align=right | 1.1 km || 
|-id=296 bgcolor=#E9E9E9
| 516296 ||  || — || June 3, 1995 || Kitt Peak || Spacewatch ||  || align=right | 1.3 km || 
|-id=297 bgcolor=#E9E9E9
| 516297 ||  || — || October 14, 1995 || Xinglong || SCAP ||  || align=right | 1.1 km || 
|-id=298 bgcolor=#E9E9E9
| 516298 ||  || — || May 11, 2010 || Mount Lemmon || Mount Lemmon Survey ||  || align=right | 2.3 km || 
|-id=299 bgcolor=#E9E9E9
| 516299 ||  || — || December 3, 2007 || Kitt Peak || Spacewatch ||  || align=right | 2.4 km || 
|-id=300 bgcolor=#d6d6d6
| 516300 ||  || — || May 27, 2010 || WISE || WISE ||  || align=right | 4.0 km || 
|}

516301–516400 

|-bgcolor=#d6d6d6
| 516301 ||  || — || April 13, 2013 || Haleakala || Pan-STARRS ||  || align=right | 3.1 km || 
|-id=302 bgcolor=#d6d6d6
| 516302 ||  || — || May 14, 2010 || WISE || WISE ||  || align=right | 3.9 km || 
|-id=303 bgcolor=#d6d6d6
| 516303 ||  || — || February 28, 2008 || Kitt Peak || Spacewatch ||  || align=right | 2.1 km || 
|-id=304 bgcolor=#d6d6d6
| 516304 ||  || — || April 10, 2013 || Haleakala || Pan-STARRS ||  || align=right | 2.0 km || 
|-id=305 bgcolor=#d6d6d6
| 516305 ||  || — || August 11, 2015 || Haleakala || Pan-STARRS ||  || align=right | 2.2 km || 
|-id=306 bgcolor=#E9E9E9
| 516306 ||  || — || November 6, 2007 || Kitt Peak || Spacewatch ||  || align=right | 2.0 km || 
|-id=307 bgcolor=#fefefe
| 516307 ||  || — || June 1, 2008 || Mount Lemmon || Mount Lemmon Survey ||  || align=right data-sort-value="0.97" | 970 m || 
|-id=308 bgcolor=#fefefe
| 516308 ||  || — || September 22, 2003 || Kitt Peak || Spacewatch ||  || align=right data-sort-value="0.85" | 850 m || 
|-id=309 bgcolor=#E9E9E9
| 516309 ||  || — || October 10, 2016 || Mount Lemmon || Mount Lemmon Survey ||  || align=right | 1.5 km || 
|-id=310 bgcolor=#E9E9E9
| 516310 ||  || — || September 17, 1995 || Kitt Peak || Spacewatch ||  || align=right | 1.0 km || 
|-id=311 bgcolor=#d6d6d6
| 516311 ||  || — || November 3, 2005 || Kitt Peak || Spacewatch ||  || align=right | 2.7 km || 
|-id=312 bgcolor=#E9E9E9
| 516312 ||  || — || January 1, 2009 || Mount Lemmon || Mount Lemmon Survey ||  || align=right | 1.4 km || 
|-id=313 bgcolor=#d6d6d6
| 516313 ||  || — || January 28, 2007 || Mount Lemmon || Mount Lemmon Survey ||  || align=right | 3.3 km || 
|-id=314 bgcolor=#d6d6d6
| 516314 ||  || — || December 27, 2009 || Kitt Peak || Spacewatch || 7:4 || align=right | 5.3 km || 
|-id=315 bgcolor=#d6d6d6
| 516315 ||  || — || October 29, 2008 || Kitt Peak || Spacewatch || 3:2 || align=right | 3.2 km || 
|-id=316 bgcolor=#d6d6d6
| 516316 ||  || — || March 17, 2012 || Mount Lemmon || Mount Lemmon Survey ||  || align=right | 3.2 km || 
|-id=317 bgcolor=#d6d6d6
| 516317 ||  || — || September 23, 2009 || Kitt Peak || Spacewatch ||  || align=right | 3.2 km || 
|-id=318 bgcolor=#d6d6d6
| 516318 ||  || — || December 10, 2006 || Kitt Peak || Spacewatch ||  || align=right | 2.4 km || 
|-id=319 bgcolor=#E9E9E9
| 516319 ||  || — || December 4, 2007 || Kitt Peak || Spacewatch ||  || align=right | 1.9 km || 
|-id=320 bgcolor=#d6d6d6
| 516320 ||  || — || December 1, 2005 || Kitt Peak || Spacewatch ||  || align=right | 2.7 km || 
|-id=321 bgcolor=#E9E9E9
| 516321 ||  || — || June 30, 2014 || Haleakala || Pan-STARRS ||  || align=right | 2.9 km || 
|-id=322 bgcolor=#d6d6d6
| 516322 ||  || — || January 28, 2006 || Mount Lemmon || Mount Lemmon Survey ||  || align=right | 3.5 km || 
|-id=323 bgcolor=#d6d6d6
| 516323 ||  || — || February 20, 2012 || Haleakala || Pan-STARRS ||  || align=right | 3.6 km || 
|-id=324 bgcolor=#d6d6d6
| 516324 ||  || — || April 30, 2008 || Mount Lemmon || Mount Lemmon Survey ||  || align=right | 3.2 km || 
|-id=325 bgcolor=#E9E9E9
| 516325 ||  || — || February 7, 2013 || Catalina || CSS ||  || align=right | 2.1 km || 
|-id=326 bgcolor=#d6d6d6
| 516326 ||  || — || February 16, 2012 || Haleakala || Pan-STARRS ||  || align=right | 2.7 km || 
|-id=327 bgcolor=#E9E9E9
| 516327 ||  || — || October 3, 2006 || Mount Lemmon || Mount Lemmon Survey ||  || align=right | 2.2 km || 
|-id=328 bgcolor=#d6d6d6
| 516328 ||  || — || February 13, 2007 || Mount Lemmon || Mount Lemmon Survey ||  || align=right | 2.2 km || 
|-id=329 bgcolor=#d6d6d6
| 516329 ||  || — || September 30, 2003 || Kitt Peak || Spacewatch ||  || align=right | 4.8 km || 
|-id=330 bgcolor=#d6d6d6
| 516330 ||  || — || January 7, 2006 || Kitt Peak || Spacewatch ||  || align=right | 2.2 km || 
|-id=331 bgcolor=#d6d6d6
| 516331 ||  || — || August 29, 2009 || Kitt Peak || Spacewatch ||  || align=right | 2.6 km || 
|-id=332 bgcolor=#d6d6d6
| 516332 ||  || — || March 12, 2007 || Mount Lemmon || Mount Lemmon Survey ||  || align=right | 2.8 km || 
|-id=333 bgcolor=#d6d6d6
| 516333 ||  || — || January 28, 2000 || Kitt Peak || Spacewatch ||  || align=right | 2.8 km || 
|-id=334 bgcolor=#d6d6d6
| 516334 ||  || — || January 26, 2006 || Mount Lemmon || Mount Lemmon Survey ||  || align=right | 3.0 km || 
|-id=335 bgcolor=#d6d6d6
| 516335 ||  || — || February 25, 2006 || Kitt Peak || Spacewatch ||  || align=right | 3.2 km || 
|-id=336 bgcolor=#d6d6d6
| 516336 ||  || — || April 6, 2008 || Mount Lemmon || Mount Lemmon Survey ||  || align=right | 2.9 km || 
|-id=337 bgcolor=#d6d6d6
| 516337 ||  || — || December 13, 2010 || Mount Lemmon || Mount Lemmon Survey ||  || align=right | 2.4 km || 
|-id=338 bgcolor=#d6d6d6
| 516338 ||  || — || October 7, 2004 || Kitt Peak || Spacewatch ||  || align=right | 2.7 km || 
|-id=339 bgcolor=#d6d6d6
| 516339 ||  || — || June 30, 2014 || Haleakala || Pan-STARRS ||  || align=right | 2.5 km || 
|-id=340 bgcolor=#E9E9E9
| 516340 ||  || — || October 16, 2006 || Catalina || CSS ||  || align=right | 2.6 km || 
|-id=341 bgcolor=#d6d6d6
| 516341 ||  || — || July 24, 2010 || WISE || WISE ||  || align=right | 3.8 km || 
|-id=342 bgcolor=#d6d6d6
| 516342 ||  || — || February 27, 2012 || Haleakala || Pan-STARRS ||  || align=right | 2.5 km || 
|-id=343 bgcolor=#C2FFFF
| 516343 ||  || — || June 25, 2011 || Mount Lemmon || Mount Lemmon Survey || L5 || align=right | 9.7 km || 
|-id=344 bgcolor=#d6d6d6
| 516344 ||  || — || March 27, 2012 || Catalina || CSS ||  || align=right | 3.5 km || 
|-id=345 bgcolor=#d6d6d6
| 516345 ||  || — || November 20, 2004 || Kitt Peak || Spacewatch ||  || align=right | 2.9 km || 
|-id=346 bgcolor=#E9E9E9
| 516346 ||  || — || November 23, 2011 || Kitt Peak || Spacewatch ||  || align=right | 2.1 km || 
|-id=347 bgcolor=#C2FFFF
| 516347 ||  || — || May 2, 2010 || WISE || WISE || L5 || align=right | 10 km || 
|-id=348 bgcolor=#d6d6d6
| 516348 ||  || — || October 9, 2010 || Mount Lemmon || Mount Lemmon Survey ||  || align=right | 2.0 km || 
|-id=349 bgcolor=#d6d6d6
| 516349 ||  || — || January 28, 2007 || Mount Lemmon || Mount Lemmon Survey ||  || align=right | 2.1 km || 
|-id=350 bgcolor=#E9E9E9
| 516350 ||  || — || July 5, 2005 || Kitt Peak || Spacewatch ||  || align=right | 2.4 km || 
|-id=351 bgcolor=#fefefe
| 516351 ||  || — || November 7, 2008 || Mount Lemmon || Mount Lemmon Survey ||  || align=right | 1.2 km || 
|-id=352 bgcolor=#d6d6d6
| 516352 ||  || — || March 15, 2007 || Mount Lemmon || Mount Lemmon Survey ||  || align=right | 3.1 km || 
|-id=353 bgcolor=#d6d6d6
| 516353 ||  || — || November 6, 2005 || Kitt Peak || Spacewatch || EOS || align=right | 1.8 km || 
|-id=354 bgcolor=#C2FFFF
| 516354 ||  || — || October 18, 2014 || Mount Lemmon || Mount Lemmon Survey || L5 || align=right | 8.2 km || 
|-id=355 bgcolor=#d6d6d6
| 516355 ||  || — || October 23, 2004 || Kitt Peak || Spacewatch ||  || align=right | 3.1 km || 
|-id=356 bgcolor=#d6d6d6
| 516356 ||  || — || November 25, 2010 || Mount Lemmon || Mount Lemmon Survey ||  || align=right | 3.0 km || 
|-id=357 bgcolor=#d6d6d6
| 516357 ||  || — || December 28, 2005 || Kitt Peak || Spacewatch ||  || align=right | 3.0 km || 
|-id=358 bgcolor=#d6d6d6
| 516358 ||  || — || March 26, 2007 || Mount Lemmon || Mount Lemmon Survey ||  || align=right | 2.5 km || 
|-id=359 bgcolor=#d6d6d6
| 516359 ||  || — || November 6, 2005 || Mount Lemmon || Mount Lemmon Survey ||  || align=right | 2.8 km || 
|-id=360 bgcolor=#E9E9E9
| 516360 ||  || — || March 19, 2009 || Kitt Peak || Spacewatch ||  || align=right | 1.6 km || 
|-id=361 bgcolor=#d6d6d6
| 516361 ||  || — || January 31, 2006 || Kitt Peak || Spacewatch ||  || align=right | 3.0 km || 
|-id=362 bgcolor=#d6d6d6
| 516362 ||  || — || September 17, 2003 || Kitt Peak || Spacewatch ||  || align=right | 3.6 km || 
|-id=363 bgcolor=#d6d6d6
| 516363 ||  || — || November 26, 2005 || Mount Lemmon || Mount Lemmon Survey ||  || align=right | 2.7 km || 
|-id=364 bgcolor=#E9E9E9
| 516364 ||  || — || July 10, 2005 || Kitt Peak || Spacewatch ||  || align=right | 2.7 km || 
|-id=365 bgcolor=#d6d6d6
| 516365 ||  || — || March 14, 2007 || Mount Lemmon || Mount Lemmon Survey ||  || align=right | 4.0 km || 
|-id=366 bgcolor=#d6d6d6
| 516366 ||  || — || March 12, 2007 || Mount Lemmon || Mount Lemmon Survey ||  || align=right | 2.8 km || 
|-id=367 bgcolor=#d6d6d6
| 516367 ||  || — || February 25, 2012 || Kitt Peak || Spacewatch ||  || align=right | 2.9 km || 
|-id=368 bgcolor=#d6d6d6
| 516368 ||  || — || January 26, 2006 || Mount Lemmon || Mount Lemmon Survey ||  || align=right | 2.8 km || 
|-id=369 bgcolor=#d6d6d6
| 516369 ||  || — || December 12, 1998 || Kitt Peak || Spacewatch ||  || align=right | 4.3 km || 
|-id=370 bgcolor=#d6d6d6
| 516370 ||  || — || October 4, 1999 || Kitt Peak || Spacewatch ||  || align=right | 3.1 km || 
|-id=371 bgcolor=#C2FFFF
| 516371 ||  || — || April 22, 2010 || WISE || WISE || L5 || align=right | 11 km || 
|-id=372 bgcolor=#d6d6d6
| 516372 ||  || — || November 10, 2009 || Kitt Peak || Spacewatch ||  || align=right | 4.1 km || 
|-id=373 bgcolor=#fefefe
| 516373 ||  || — || February 21, 2007 || Mount Lemmon || Mount Lemmon Survey ||  || align=right data-sort-value="0.52" | 520 m || 
|-id=374 bgcolor=#d6d6d6
| 516374 ||  || — || May 13, 2007 || Mount Lemmon || Mount Lemmon Survey ||  || align=right | 3.4 km || 
|-id=375 bgcolor=#C2FFFF
| 516375 ||  || — || February 24, 2006 || Kitt Peak || Spacewatch || L5 || align=right | 9.5 km || 
|-id=376 bgcolor=#fefefe
| 516376 ||  || — || December 12, 2004 || Kitt Peak || Spacewatch ||  || align=right data-sort-value="0.92" | 920 m || 
|-id=377 bgcolor=#d6d6d6
| 516377 ||  || — || November 26, 2009 || Mount Lemmon || Mount Lemmon Survey ||  || align=right | 3.8 km || 
|-id=378 bgcolor=#fefefe
| 516378 ||  || — || August 29, 2006 || Kitt Peak || Spacewatch ||  || align=right data-sort-value="0.98" | 980 m || 
|-id=379 bgcolor=#E9E9E9
| 516379 ||  || — || June 23, 2000 || Kitt Peak || Spacewatch ||  || align=right | 1.8 km || 
|-id=380 bgcolor=#E9E9E9
| 516380 ||  || — || August 5, 2008 || Siding Spring || SSS ||  || align=right | 1.9 km || 
|-id=381 bgcolor=#d6d6d6
| 516381 ||  || — || June 22, 2010 || WISE || WISE ||  || align=right | 4.7 km || 
|-id=382 bgcolor=#d6d6d6
| 516382 ||  || — || December 21, 2005 || Catalina || CSS ||  || align=right | 3.7 km || 
|-id=383 bgcolor=#E9E9E9
| 516383 ||  || — || January 22, 2004 || Socorro || LINEAR ||  || align=right | 2.4 km || 
|-id=384 bgcolor=#E9E9E9
| 516384 ||  || — || February 16, 2001 || Socorro || LINEAR ||  || align=right | 2.9 km || 
|-id=385 bgcolor=#fefefe
| 516385 ||  || — || September 21, 2009 || Mount Lemmon || Mount Lemmon Survey ||  || align=right data-sort-value="0.91" | 910 m || 
|-id=386 bgcolor=#C2FFFF
| 516386 ||  || — || December 14, 2004 || Kitt Peak || Spacewatch || L5 || align=right | 12 km || 
|-id=387 bgcolor=#E9E9E9
| 516387 ||  || — || October 17, 1995 || Kitt Peak || Spacewatch ||  || align=right | 1.7 km || 
|-id=388 bgcolor=#E9E9E9
| 516388 ||  || — || January 12, 1996 || Kitt Peak || Spacewatch ||  || align=right | 1.7 km || 
|-id=389 bgcolor=#E9E9E9
| 516389 ||  || — || January 16, 1996 || Kitt Peak || Spacewatch ||  || align=right | 2.0 km || 
|-id=390 bgcolor=#E9E9E9
| 516390 ||  || — || October 11, 1996 || Kitt Peak || Spacewatch ||  || align=right | 2.1 km || 
|-id=391 bgcolor=#d6d6d6
| 516391 ||  || — || June 1, 1997 || Kitt Peak || Spacewatch ||  || align=right | 2.5 km || 
|-id=392 bgcolor=#FA8072
| 516392 ||  || — || November 9, 1999 || Socorro || LINEAR || H || align=right data-sort-value="0.59" | 590 m || 
|-id=393 bgcolor=#d6d6d6
| 516393 ||  || — || January 3, 2000 || Socorro || LINEAR ||  || align=right | 3.9 km || 
|-id=394 bgcolor=#E9E9E9
| 516394 ||  || — || January 26, 2000 || Kitt Peak || Spacewatch ||  || align=right | 1.5 km || 
|-id=395 bgcolor=#E9E9E9
| 516395 ||  || — || February 4, 2000 || Kitt Peak || Spacewatch ||  || align=right | 1.5 km || 
|-id=396 bgcolor=#FFC2E0
| 516396 ||  || — || November 25, 2000 || Socorro || LINEAR || AMO || align=right data-sort-value="0.26" | 260 m || 
|-id=397 bgcolor=#E9E9E9
| 516397 ||  || — || March 29, 2001 || Kitt Peak || Spacewatch ||  || align=right | 1.4 km || 
|-id=398 bgcolor=#FFC2E0
| 516398 ||  || — || April 24, 2001 || Anderson Mesa || LONEOS || AMO || align=right data-sort-value="0.31" | 310 m || 
|-id=399 bgcolor=#fefefe
| 516399 ||  || — || August 16, 2001 || Socorro || LINEAR ||  || align=right data-sort-value="0.98" | 980 m || 
|-id=400 bgcolor=#fefefe
| 516400 ||  || — || September 19, 2001 || Socorro || LINEAR ||  || align=right data-sort-value="0.57" | 570 m || 
|}

516401–516500 

|-bgcolor=#fefefe
| 516401 ||  || — || September 22, 2001 || Kitt Peak || Spacewatch ||  || align=right data-sort-value="0.74" | 740 m || 
|-id=402 bgcolor=#fefefe
| 516402 ||  || — || October 15, 2001 || Kitt Peak || Spacewatch || H || align=right data-sort-value="0.53" | 530 m || 
|-id=403 bgcolor=#fefefe
| 516403 ||  || — || October 17, 2001 || Kitt Peak || Spacewatch || H || align=right data-sort-value="0.62" | 620 m || 
|-id=404 bgcolor=#fefefe
| 516404 ||  || — || October 16, 2001 || Palomar || NEAT ||  || align=right data-sort-value="0.58" | 580 m || 
|-id=405 bgcolor=#fefefe
| 516405 ||  || — || January 6, 2002 || Kitt Peak || Spacewatch ||  || align=right data-sort-value="0.57" | 570 m || 
|-id=406 bgcolor=#fefefe
| 516406 ||  || — || February 8, 2002 || Kitt Peak || Spacewatch || H || align=right data-sort-value="0.59" | 590 m || 
|-id=407 bgcolor=#d6d6d6
| 516407 ||  || — || April 5, 2002 || Palomar || NEAT ||  || align=right | 2.6 km || 
|-id=408 bgcolor=#d6d6d6
| 516408 ||  || — || April 4, 2002 || Kitt Peak || Spacewatch || 3:2 || align=right | 5.6 km || 
|-id=409 bgcolor=#E9E9E9
| 516409 ||  || — || May 11, 2002 || Socorro || LINEAR ||  || align=right | 1.0 km || 
|-id=410 bgcolor=#d6d6d6
| 516410 ||  || — || May 17, 2002 || Socorro || LINEAR || Tj (2.99) || align=right | 3.5 km || 
|-id=411 bgcolor=#E9E9E9
| 516411 ||  || — || September 12, 1994 || Kitt Peak || Spacewatch ||  || align=right | 1.0 km || 
|-id=412 bgcolor=#E9E9E9
| 516412 ||  || — || August 3, 2002 || Campo Imperatore || CINEOS ||  || align=right | 1.0 km || 
|-id=413 bgcolor=#fefefe
| 516413 ||  || — || August 29, 2002 || Palomar || S. F. Hönig ||  || align=right data-sort-value="0.59" | 590 m || 
|-id=414 bgcolor=#fefefe
| 516414 ||  || — || September 1, 2002 || Palomar || NEAT ||  || align=right data-sort-value="0.68" | 680 m || 
|-id=415 bgcolor=#E9E9E9
| 516415 ||  || — || September 1, 2002 || Palomar || NEAT ||  || align=right | 1.4 km || 
|-id=416 bgcolor=#fefefe
| 516416 ||  || — || October 4, 2002 || Apache Point || SDSS ||  || align=right data-sort-value="0.84" | 840 m || 
|-id=417 bgcolor=#fefefe
| 516417 ||  || — || October 28, 2002 || Palomar || NEAT || PHO || align=right | 2.2 km || 
|-id=418 bgcolor=#E9E9E9
| 516418 ||  || — || November 2, 2002 || Haleakala || NEAT ||  || align=right | 1.5 km || 
|-id=419 bgcolor=#C2FFFF
| 516419 ||  || — || November 22, 2014 || Mount Lemmon || Mount Lemmon Survey || L5 || align=right | 7.7 km || 
|-id=420 bgcolor=#FFC2E0
| 516420 ||  || — || March 25, 2003 || Haleakala || NEAT || AMO || align=right data-sort-value="0.62" | 620 m || 
|-id=421 bgcolor=#fefefe
| 516421 ||  || — || April 7, 2003 || Kitt Peak || Spacewatch || H || align=right data-sort-value="0.41" | 410 m || 
|-id=422 bgcolor=#fefefe
| 516422 ||  || — || April 7, 2003 || Kitt Peak || Spacewatch || H || align=right data-sort-value="0.47" | 470 m || 
|-id=423 bgcolor=#FFC2E0
| 516423 ||  || — || May 1, 2003 || Kitt Peak || Spacewatch || AMOunusual || align=right data-sort-value="0.71" | 710 m || 
|-id=424 bgcolor=#fefefe
| 516424 ||  || — || December 28, 2005 || Mount Lemmon || Mount Lemmon Survey ||  || align=right data-sort-value="0.69" | 690 m || 
|-id=425 bgcolor=#E9E9E9
| 516425 ||  || — || September 18, 2003 || Kitt Peak || Spacewatch ||  || align=right | 1.4 km || 
|-id=426 bgcolor=#E9E9E9
| 516426 ||  || — || September 29, 2003 || Anderson Mesa || LONEOS ||  || align=right | 1.4 km || 
|-id=427 bgcolor=#d6d6d6
| 516427 ||  || — || October 2, 2003 || Kitt Peak || Spacewatch ||  || align=right | 3.4 km || 
|-id=428 bgcolor=#FFC2E0
| 516428 ||  || — || October 21, 2003 || Socorro || LINEAR || AMO +1km || align=right data-sort-value="0.98" | 980 m || 
|-id=429 bgcolor=#d6d6d6
| 516429 ||  || — || October 25, 2003 || Socorro || LINEAR || EUP || align=right | 4.5 km || 
|-id=430 bgcolor=#fefefe
| 516430 ||  || — || October 28, 2003 || Socorro || LINEAR || H || align=right data-sort-value="0.62" | 620 m || 
|-id=431 bgcolor=#fefefe
| 516431 ||  || — || February 16, 2004 || Socorro || LINEAR ||  || align=right data-sort-value="0.91" | 910 m || 
|-id=432 bgcolor=#fefefe
| 516432 ||  || — || February 17, 2004 || Kitt Peak || Spacewatch ||  || align=right data-sort-value="0.92" | 920 m || 
|-id=433 bgcolor=#fefefe
| 516433 ||  || — || February 17, 2004 || Catalina || CSS ||  || align=right data-sort-value="0.74" | 740 m || 
|-id=434 bgcolor=#fefefe
| 516434 ||  || — || February 16, 2004 || Kitt Peak || Spacewatch ||  || align=right data-sort-value="0.60" | 600 m || 
|-id=435 bgcolor=#FFC2E0
| 516435 ||  || — || March 29, 2004 || Siding Spring || SSS || ATEcritical || align=right data-sort-value="0.20" | 200 m || 
|-id=436 bgcolor=#E9E9E9
| 516436 ||  || — || March 17, 2004 || Socorro || LINEAR ||  || align=right | 2.4 km || 
|-id=437 bgcolor=#fefefe
| 516437 ||  || — || April 14, 2004 || Socorro || LINEAR || H || align=right data-sort-value="0.82" | 820 m || 
|-id=438 bgcolor=#fefefe
| 516438 ||  || — || May 10, 2004 || Kitt Peak || Spacewatch ||  || align=right data-sort-value="0.68" | 680 m || 
|-id=439 bgcolor=#d6d6d6
| 516439 ||  || — || August 22, 2004 || Kitt Peak || Spacewatch ||  || align=right | 1.8 km || 
|-id=440 bgcolor=#d6d6d6
| 516440 ||  || — || September 10, 2004 || Kitt Peak || Spacewatch ||  || align=right | 2.0 km || 
|-id=441 bgcolor=#fefefe
| 516441 ||  || — || September 16, 2004 || Anderson Mesa || LONEOS ||  || align=right data-sort-value="0.86" | 860 m || 
|-id=442 bgcolor=#d6d6d6
| 516442 ||  || — || October 7, 2004 || Kitt Peak || Spacewatch ||  || align=right | 3.5 km || 
|-id=443 bgcolor=#d6d6d6
| 516443 ||  || — || October 7, 2004 || Kitt Peak || Spacewatch ||  || align=right | 2.7 km || 
|-id=444 bgcolor=#d6d6d6
| 516444 ||  || — || October 7, 2004 || Kitt Peak || Spacewatch ||  || align=right | 2.8 km || 
|-id=445 bgcolor=#d6d6d6
| 516445 ||  || — || November 17, 2004 || Campo Imperatore || CINEOS ||  || align=right | 3.3 km || 
|-id=446 bgcolor=#fefefe
| 516446 ||  || — || December 11, 2004 || Socorro || LINEAR || H || align=right data-sort-value="0.65" | 650 m || 
|-id=447 bgcolor=#E9E9E9
| 516447 ||  || — || January 6, 2005 || Socorro || LINEAR ||  || align=right | 1.2 km || 
|-id=448 bgcolor=#E9E9E9
| 516448 ||  || — || January 15, 2005 || Kitt Peak || Spacewatch ||  || align=right | 1.4 km || 
|-id=449 bgcolor=#E9E9E9
| 516449 ||  || — || February 1, 2005 || Kitt Peak || Spacewatch ||  || align=right | 1.4 km || 
|-id=450 bgcolor=#E9E9E9
| 516450 ||  || — || February 2, 2005 || Kitt Peak || Spacewatch ||  || align=right data-sort-value="0.78" | 780 m || 
|-id=451 bgcolor=#fefefe
| 516451 ||  || — || March 11, 2005 || Mount Lemmon || Mount Lemmon Survey || H || align=right data-sort-value="0.59" | 590 m || 
|-id=452 bgcolor=#E9E9E9
| 516452 ||  || — || March 4, 2005 || Mount Lemmon || Mount Lemmon Survey ||  || align=right | 1.1 km || 
|-id=453 bgcolor=#E9E9E9
| 516453 ||  || — || March 10, 2005 || Catalina || CSS ||  || align=right | 1.9 km || 
|-id=454 bgcolor=#FFC2E0
| 516454 ||  || — || March 31, 2005 || Anderson Mesa || LONEOS || APOPHA || align=right data-sort-value="0.68" | 680 m || 
|-id=455 bgcolor=#E9E9E9
| 516455 ||  || — || April 2, 2005 || Mount Lemmon || Mount Lemmon Survey || HNS || align=right data-sort-value="0.95" | 950 m || 
|-id=456 bgcolor=#E9E9E9
| 516456 ||  || — || March 30, 2005 || Catalina || CSS ||  || align=right | 1.6 km || 
|-id=457 bgcolor=#FFC2E0
| 516457 ||  || — || April 20, 2005 || Catalina || CSS || AMO || align=right data-sort-value="0.39" | 390 m || 
|-id=458 bgcolor=#FA8072
| 516458 ||  || — || May 12, 2005 || Catalina || CSS || H || align=right data-sort-value="0.62" | 620 m || 
|-id=459 bgcolor=#E9E9E9
| 516459 ||  || — || May 8, 2005 || Mount Lemmon || Mount Lemmon Survey ||  || align=right | 1.5 km || 
|-id=460 bgcolor=#FA8072
| 516460 ||  || — || June 6, 2005 || Siding Spring || SSS ||  || align=right data-sort-value="0.59" | 590 m || 
|-id=461 bgcolor=#FA8072
| 516461 ||  || — || June 6, 2005 || Siding Spring || SSS ||  || align=right data-sort-value="0.59" | 590 m || 
|-id=462 bgcolor=#FA8072
| 516462 ||  || — || June 11, 2005 || Kitt Peak || Spacewatch ||  || align=right data-sort-value="0.69" | 690 m || 
|-id=463 bgcolor=#E9E9E9
| 516463 ||  || — || June 28, 2005 || Kitt Peak || Spacewatch ||  || align=right | 1.8 km || 
|-id=464 bgcolor=#fefefe
| 516464 ||  || — || June 30, 2005 || Kitt Peak || Spacewatch ||  || align=right data-sort-value="0.61" | 610 m || 
|-id=465 bgcolor=#fefefe
| 516465 ||  || — || June 30, 2005 || Kitt Peak || Spacewatch ||  || align=right data-sort-value="0.70" | 700 m || 
|-id=466 bgcolor=#d6d6d6
| 516466 ||  || — || July 5, 2005 || Kitt Peak || Spacewatch ||  || align=right | 2.8 km || 
|-id=467 bgcolor=#fefefe
| 516467 ||  || — || July 28, 2005 || Palomar || NEAT ||  || align=right data-sort-value="0.66" | 660 m || 
|-id=468 bgcolor=#E9E9E9
| 516468 ||  || — || August 24, 2005 || Palomar || NEAT ||  || align=right | 2.5 km || 
|-id=469 bgcolor=#fefefe
| 516469 ||  || — || August 28, 2005 || Kitt Peak || Spacewatch ||  || align=right data-sort-value="0.65" | 650 m || 
|-id=470 bgcolor=#fefefe
| 516470 ||  || — || September 26, 2005 || Kitt Peak || Spacewatch || (2076) || align=right data-sort-value="0.74" | 740 m || 
|-id=471 bgcolor=#fefefe
| 516471 ||  || — || September 23, 2005 || Catalina || CSS ||  || align=right data-sort-value="0.67" | 670 m || 
|-id=472 bgcolor=#d6d6d6
| 516472 ||  || — || September 25, 2005 || Kitt Peak || Spacewatch ||  || align=right | 2.0 km || 
|-id=473 bgcolor=#fefefe
| 516473 ||  || — || September 26, 2005 || Kitt Peak || Spacewatch || (2076) || align=right data-sort-value="0.78" | 780 m || 
|-id=474 bgcolor=#d6d6d6
| 516474 ||  || — || October 1, 2005 || Kitt Peak || Spacewatch || KOR || align=right | 1.1 km || 
|-id=475 bgcolor=#fefefe
| 516475 ||  || — || September 30, 2005 || Catalina || CSS ||  || align=right data-sort-value="0.78" | 780 m || 
|-id=476 bgcolor=#FA8072
| 516476 ||  || — || September 27, 2005 || Kitt Peak || Spacewatch ||  || align=right data-sort-value="0.33" | 330 m || 
|-id=477 bgcolor=#d6d6d6
| 516477 ||  || — || September 27, 2005 || Kitt Peak || Spacewatch || EOS || align=right | 1.3 km || 
|-id=478 bgcolor=#d6d6d6
| 516478 ||  || — || October 25, 2005 || Socorro || LINEAR || EUP || align=right | 3.0 km || 
|-id=479 bgcolor=#d6d6d6
| 516479 ||  || — || October 24, 2005 || Kitt Peak || Spacewatch ||  || align=right | 2.9 km || 
|-id=480 bgcolor=#d6d6d6
| 516480 ||  || — || October 24, 2005 || Kitt Peak || Spacewatch ||  || align=right | 1.9 km || 
|-id=481 bgcolor=#fefefe
| 516481 ||  || — || October 1, 2005 || Mount Lemmon || Mount Lemmon Survey ||  || align=right data-sort-value="0.65" | 650 m || 
|-id=482 bgcolor=#fefefe
| 516482 ||  || — || October 22, 2005 || Kitt Peak || Spacewatch ||  || align=right data-sort-value="0.58" | 580 m || 
|-id=483 bgcolor=#d6d6d6
| 516483 ||  || — || October 24, 2005 || Kitt Peak || Spacewatch || EOS || align=right | 1.5 km || 
|-id=484 bgcolor=#fefefe
| 516484 ||  || — || October 25, 2005 || Mount Lemmon || Mount Lemmon Survey ||  || align=right data-sort-value="0.64" | 640 m || 
|-id=485 bgcolor=#fefefe
| 516485 ||  || — || September 23, 2005 || Kitt Peak || Spacewatch ||  || align=right data-sort-value="0.96" | 960 m || 
|-id=486 bgcolor=#fefefe
| 516486 ||  || — || October 25, 2005 || Kitt Peak || Spacewatch ||  || align=right data-sort-value="0.76" | 760 m || 
|-id=487 bgcolor=#d6d6d6
| 516487 ||  || — || October 25, 2005 || Mount Lemmon || Mount Lemmon Survey ||  || align=right | 2.1 km || 
|-id=488 bgcolor=#fefefe
| 516488 ||  || — || October 26, 2005 || Kitt Peak || Spacewatch ||  || align=right data-sort-value="0.59" | 590 m || 
|-id=489 bgcolor=#d6d6d6
| 516489 ||  || — || October 27, 2005 || Mount Lemmon || Mount Lemmon Survey ||  || align=right | 2.6 km || 
|-id=490 bgcolor=#fefefe
| 516490 ||  || — || October 31, 2005 || Socorro || LINEAR || V || align=right data-sort-value="0.60" | 600 m || 
|-id=491 bgcolor=#fefefe
| 516491 ||  || — || November 4, 2005 || Catalina || CSS ||  || align=right data-sort-value="0.70" | 700 m || 
|-id=492 bgcolor=#fefefe
| 516492 ||  || — || October 25, 2005 || Kitt Peak || Spacewatch ||  || align=right data-sort-value="0.65" | 650 m || 
|-id=493 bgcolor=#fefefe
| 516493 ||  || — || September 18, 2001 || Anderson Mesa || LONEOS ||  || align=right data-sort-value="0.81" | 810 m || 
|-id=494 bgcolor=#fefefe
| 516494 ||  || — || November 25, 2005 || Kitt Peak || Spacewatch || MAS || align=right data-sort-value="0.57" | 570 m || 
|-id=495 bgcolor=#fefefe
| 516495 ||  || — || October 28, 2005 || Kitt Peak || Spacewatch ||  || align=right data-sort-value="0.82" | 820 m || 
|-id=496 bgcolor=#fefefe
| 516496 ||  || — || November 4, 2005 || Kitt Peak || Spacewatch || MAS || align=right data-sort-value="0.54" | 540 m || 
|-id=497 bgcolor=#d6d6d6
| 516497 ||  || — || November 26, 2005 || Kitt Peak || Spacewatch || EOS || align=right | 1.4 km || 
|-id=498 bgcolor=#fefefe
| 516498 ||  || — || December 24, 2005 || Kitt Peak || Spacewatch || MAS || align=right data-sort-value="0.54" | 540 m || 
|-id=499 bgcolor=#d6d6d6
| 516499 ||  || — || December 26, 2005 || Kitt Peak || Spacewatch ||  || align=right | 2.5 km || 
|-id=500 bgcolor=#d6d6d6
| 516500 ||  || — || December 26, 2005 || Kitt Peak || Spacewatch ||  || align=right | 3.2 km || 
|}

516501–516600 

|-bgcolor=#d6d6d6
| 516501 ||  || — || November 28, 2005 || Catalina || CSS ||  || align=right | 2.7 km || 
|-id=502 bgcolor=#d6d6d6
| 516502 ||  || — || December 25, 2005 || Kitt Peak || Spacewatch || URS || align=right | 3.2 km || 
|-id=503 bgcolor=#d6d6d6
| 516503 ||  || — || December 24, 2005 || Kitt Peak || Spacewatch ||  || align=right | 2.1 km || 
|-id=504 bgcolor=#d6d6d6
| 516504 ||  || — || December 24, 2005 || Kitt Peak || Spacewatch || THM || align=right | 1.9 km || 
|-id=505 bgcolor=#fefefe
| 516505 ||  || — || January 5, 2006 || Mount Lemmon || Mount Lemmon Survey ||  || align=right data-sort-value="0.80" | 800 m || 
|-id=506 bgcolor=#fefefe
| 516506 ||  || — || January 4, 2006 || Mount Lemmon || Mount Lemmon Survey ||  || align=right data-sort-value="0.90" | 900 m || 
|-id=507 bgcolor=#d6d6d6
| 516507 ||  || — || January 20, 2006 || Kitt Peak || Spacewatch ||  || align=right | 3.5 km || 
|-id=508 bgcolor=#fefefe
| 516508 ||  || — || December 5, 2005 || Mount Lemmon || Mount Lemmon Survey ||  || align=right data-sort-value="0.75" | 750 m || 
|-id=509 bgcolor=#d6d6d6
| 516509 ||  || — || January 25, 2006 || Kitt Peak || Spacewatch ||  || align=right | 2.1 km || 
|-id=510 bgcolor=#d6d6d6
| 516510 ||  || — || January 8, 2006 || Kitt Peak || Spacewatch ||  || align=right | 2.7 km || 
|-id=511 bgcolor=#fefefe
| 516511 ||  || — || January 23, 2006 || Kitt Peak || Spacewatch ||  || align=right data-sort-value="0.62" | 620 m || 
|-id=512 bgcolor=#d6d6d6
| 516512 ||  || — || January 31, 2006 || Kitt Peak || Spacewatch ||  || align=right | 2.2 km || 
|-id=513 bgcolor=#d6d6d6
| 516513 ||  || — || February 1, 2006 || Kitt Peak || Spacewatch ||  || align=right | 3.0 km || 
|-id=514 bgcolor=#d6d6d6
| 516514 ||  || — || February 20, 2006 || Kitt Peak || Spacewatch ||  || align=right | 2.1 km || 
|-id=515 bgcolor=#d6d6d6
| 516515 ||  || — || February 27, 2006 || Kitt Peak || Spacewatch ||  || align=right | 2.8 km || 
|-id=516 bgcolor=#d6d6d6
| 516516 ||  || — || February 25, 2006 || Mount Lemmon || Mount Lemmon Survey ||  || align=right | 2.7 km || 
|-id=517 bgcolor=#C2FFFF
| 516517 ||  || — || February 1, 2006 || Kitt Peak || Spacewatch || L5 || align=right | 12 km || 
|-id=518 bgcolor=#E9E9E9
| 516518 ||  || — || April 19, 2006 || Kitt Peak || Spacewatch ||  || align=right data-sort-value="0.65" | 650 m || 
|-id=519 bgcolor=#E9E9E9
| 516519 ||  || — || April 20, 2006 || Kitt Peak || Spacewatch ||  || align=right data-sort-value="0.82" | 820 m || 
|-id=520 bgcolor=#E9E9E9
| 516520 ||  || — || May 19, 2006 || Mount Lemmon || Mount Lemmon Survey ||  || align=right data-sort-value="0.78" | 780 m || 
|-id=521 bgcolor=#E9E9E9
| 516521 ||  || — || May 28, 2006 || Kitt Peak || Spacewatch ||  || align=right data-sort-value="0.90" | 900 m || 
|-id=522 bgcolor=#E9E9E9
| 516522 ||  || — || August 19, 2006 || Kitt Peak || Spacewatch ||  || align=right | 1.1 km || 
|-id=523 bgcolor=#E9E9E9
| 516523 ||  || — || August 18, 2006 || Kitt Peak || Spacewatch ||  || align=right | 2.3 km || 
|-id=524 bgcolor=#E9E9E9
| 516524 ||  || — || September 14, 2006 || Kitt Peak || Spacewatch ||  || align=right | 1.6 km || 
|-id=525 bgcolor=#E9E9E9
| 516525 ||  || — || August 30, 2006 || Socorro || LINEAR ||  || align=right | 1.4 km || 
|-id=526 bgcolor=#E9E9E9
| 516526 ||  || — || September 14, 2006 || Kitt Peak || Spacewatch ||  || align=right | 2.1 km || 
|-id=527 bgcolor=#E9E9E9
| 516527 ||  || — || September 15, 2006 || Kitt Peak || Spacewatch ||  || align=right | 1.6 km || 
|-id=528 bgcolor=#E9E9E9
| 516528 ||  || — || August 28, 2006 || Catalina || CSS ||  || align=right | 1.7 km || 
|-id=529 bgcolor=#E9E9E9
| 516529 ||  || — || September 16, 2006 || Catalina || CSS ||  || align=right | 1.7 km || 
|-id=530 bgcolor=#fefefe
| 516530 ||  || — || September 16, 2006 || Anderson Mesa || LONEOS ||  || align=right data-sort-value="0.62" | 620 m || 
|-id=531 bgcolor=#E9E9E9
| 516531 ||  || — || September 17, 2006 || Anderson Mesa || LONEOS ||  || align=right | 1.2 km || 
|-id=532 bgcolor=#E9E9E9
| 516532 ||  || — || September 15, 2006 || Kitt Peak || Spacewatch ||  || align=right | 1.3 km || 
|-id=533 bgcolor=#E9E9E9
| 516533 ||  || — || September 20, 2006 || Catalina || CSS || JUN || align=right | 1.2 km || 
|-id=534 bgcolor=#fefefe
| 516534 ||  || — || September 22, 2006 || Catalina || CSS || H || align=right data-sort-value="0.64" | 640 m || 
|-id=535 bgcolor=#E9E9E9
| 516535 ||  || — || September 14, 2006 || Kitt Peak || Spacewatch ||  || align=right data-sort-value="0.86" | 860 m || 
|-id=536 bgcolor=#fefefe
| 516536 ||  || — || September 25, 2006 || Mount Lemmon || Mount Lemmon Survey || H || align=right data-sort-value="0.59" | 590 m || 
|-id=537 bgcolor=#E9E9E9
| 516537 ||  || — || September 26, 2006 || Kitt Peak || Spacewatch ||  || align=right | 2.0 km || 
|-id=538 bgcolor=#E9E9E9
| 516538 ||  || — || September 26, 2006 || Kitt Peak || Spacewatch ||  || align=right | 2.2 km || 
|-id=539 bgcolor=#fefefe
| 516539 ||  || — || September 15, 2006 || Kitt Peak || Spacewatch ||  || align=right data-sort-value="0.52" | 520 m || 
|-id=540 bgcolor=#E9E9E9
| 516540 ||  || — || September 26, 2006 || Mount Lemmon || Mount Lemmon Survey ||  || align=right | 2.3 km || 
|-id=541 bgcolor=#FA8072
| 516541 ||  || — || September 17, 2006 || Kitt Peak || Spacewatch ||  || align=right data-sort-value="0.62" | 620 m || 
|-id=542 bgcolor=#E9E9E9
| 516542 ||  || — || September 17, 2006 || Kitt Peak || Spacewatch ||  || align=right | 1.8 km || 
|-id=543 bgcolor=#E9E9E9
| 516543 ||  || — || September 25, 2006 || Anderson Mesa || LONEOS ||  || align=right | 2.2 km || 
|-id=544 bgcolor=#E9E9E9
| 516544 ||  || — || September 16, 2006 || Apache Point || A. C. Becker ||  || align=right | 1.3 km || 
|-id=545 bgcolor=#E9E9E9
| 516545 ||  || — || October 10, 2006 || Palomar || NEAT ||  || align=right | 2.2 km || 
|-id=546 bgcolor=#fefefe
| 516546 ||  || — || September 30, 2006 || Mount Lemmon || Mount Lemmon Survey ||  || align=right data-sort-value="0.67" | 670 m || 
|-id=547 bgcolor=#fefefe
| 516547 ||  || — || September 28, 2006 || Mount Lemmon || Mount Lemmon Survey || H || align=right data-sort-value="0.52" | 520 m || 
|-id=548 bgcolor=#E9E9E9
| 516548 ||  || — || October 17, 2006 || Mount Lemmon || Mount Lemmon Survey ||  || align=right | 1.9 km || 
|-id=549 bgcolor=#E9E9E9
| 516549 ||  || — || October 19, 2006 || Kitt Peak || Spacewatch ||  || align=right | 2.2 km || 
|-id=550 bgcolor=#fefefe
| 516550 ||  || — || October 28, 2006 || Kitt Peak || Spacewatch ||  || align=right data-sort-value="0.45" | 450 m || 
|-id=551 bgcolor=#E9E9E9
| 516551 ||  || — || October 13, 2006 || Kitt Peak || Spacewatch ||  || align=right | 1.9 km || 
|-id=552 bgcolor=#d6d6d6
| 516552 ||  || — || November 9, 2006 || Kitt Peak || Spacewatch ||  || align=right | 1.8 km || 
|-id=553 bgcolor=#d6d6d6
| 516553 ||  || — || October 16, 2006 || Catalina || CSS ||  || align=right | 2.9 km || 
|-id=554 bgcolor=#fefefe
| 516554 ||  || — || November 15, 2006 || Kitt Peak || Spacewatch ||  || align=right data-sort-value="0.58" | 580 m || 
|-id=555 bgcolor=#d6d6d6
| 516555 ||  || — || November 15, 2006 || Kitt Peak || Spacewatch ||  || align=right | 2.0 km || 
|-id=556 bgcolor=#FA8072
| 516556 ||  || — || October 30, 2006 || Catalina || CSS || H || align=right data-sort-value="0.59" | 590 m || 
|-id=557 bgcolor=#fefefe
| 516557 ||  || — || January 30, 2004 || Catalina || CSS || H || align=right data-sort-value="0.74" | 740 m || 
|-id=558 bgcolor=#E9E9E9
| 516558 ||  || — || November 23, 2006 || Kitt Peak || Spacewatch ||  || align=right | 2.1 km || 
|-id=559 bgcolor=#fefefe
| 516559 ||  || — || November 15, 2006 || Catalina || CSS || H || align=right data-sort-value="0.75" | 750 m || 
|-id=560 bgcolor=#E9E9E9
| 516560 Annapolisroyal ||  ||  || December 12, 2006 || Mauna Kea || D. D. Balam ||  || align=right | 2.1 km || 
|-id=561 bgcolor=#fefefe
| 516561 ||  || — || December 21, 2006 || Kitt Peak || Spacewatch ||  || align=right data-sort-value="0.61" | 610 m || 
|-id=562 bgcolor=#fefefe
| 516562 ||  || — || January 9, 2007 || Mount Lemmon || Mount Lemmon Survey || H || align=right data-sort-value="0.61" | 610 m || 
|-id=563 bgcolor=#fefefe
| 516563 ||  || — || December 16, 2006 || Mount Lemmon || Mount Lemmon Survey ||  || align=right data-sort-value="0.51" | 510 m || 
|-id=564 bgcolor=#d6d6d6
| 516564 ||  || — || November 21, 2006 || Mount Lemmon || Mount Lemmon Survey ||  || align=right | 1.8 km || 
|-id=565 bgcolor=#fefefe
| 516565 ||  || — || February 17, 2007 || Kitt Peak || Spacewatch ||  || align=right data-sort-value="0.73" | 730 m || 
|-id=566 bgcolor=#fefefe
| 516566 ||  || — || February 17, 2007 || Kitt Peak || Spacewatch ||  || align=right data-sort-value="0.64" | 640 m || 
|-id=567 bgcolor=#fefefe
| 516567 ||  || — || January 27, 2007 || Mount Lemmon || Mount Lemmon Survey ||  || align=right data-sort-value="0.59" | 590 m || 
|-id=568 bgcolor=#d6d6d6
| 516568 ||  || — || February 23, 2007 || Kitt Peak || Spacewatch ||  || align=right | 2.2 km || 
|-id=569 bgcolor=#fefefe
| 516569 ||  || — || February 26, 2007 || Mount Lemmon || Mount Lemmon Survey || NYS || align=right data-sort-value="0.52" | 520 m || 
|-id=570 bgcolor=#fefefe
| 516570 ||  || — || February 27, 2007 || Kitt Peak || Spacewatch || NYS || align=right data-sort-value="0.54" | 540 m || 
|-id=571 bgcolor=#fefefe
| 516571 ||  || — || February 26, 2007 || Mount Lemmon || Mount Lemmon Survey || NYS || align=right data-sort-value="0.51" | 510 m || 
|-id=572 bgcolor=#d6d6d6
| 516572 ||  || — || February 23, 2007 || Kitt Peak || Spacewatch ||  || align=right | 2.7 km || 
|-id=573 bgcolor=#d6d6d6
| 516573 ||  || — || March 9, 2007 || Mount Lemmon || Mount Lemmon Survey ||  || align=right | 2.7 km || 
|-id=574 bgcolor=#fefefe
| 516574 ||  || — || February 23, 2007 || Mount Lemmon || Mount Lemmon Survey || MAS || align=right data-sort-value="0.54" | 540 m || 
|-id=575 bgcolor=#fefefe
| 516575 ||  || — || March 11, 2007 || Kitt Peak || Spacewatch || NYS || align=right data-sort-value="0.51" | 510 m || 
|-id=576 bgcolor=#d6d6d6
| 516576 ||  || — || January 28, 2007 || Mount Lemmon || Mount Lemmon Survey ||  || align=right | 3.2 km || 
|-id=577 bgcolor=#fefefe
| 516577 ||  || — || February 21, 2007 || Kitt Peak || Spacewatch || MAS || align=right data-sort-value="0.57" | 570 m || 
|-id=578 bgcolor=#fefefe
| 516578 ||  || — || October 1, 2005 || Mount Lemmon || Mount Lemmon Survey ||  || align=right data-sort-value="0.60" | 600 m || 
|-id=579 bgcolor=#d6d6d6
| 516579 ||  || — || February 17, 2007 || Kitt Peak || Spacewatch ||  || align=right | 2.3 km || 
|-id=580 bgcolor=#fefefe
| 516580 ||  || — || March 9, 2007 || Mount Lemmon || Mount Lemmon Survey || MAS || align=right data-sort-value="0.61" | 610 m || 
|-id=581 bgcolor=#fefefe
| 516581 ||  || — || January 27, 2007 || Mount Lemmon || Mount Lemmon Survey || MAS || align=right data-sort-value="0.65" | 650 m || 
|-id=582 bgcolor=#fefefe
| 516582 ||  || — || February 17, 2007 || Mount Lemmon || Mount Lemmon Survey ||  || align=right data-sort-value="0.78" | 780 m || 
|-id=583 bgcolor=#d6d6d6
| 516583 ||  || — || March 14, 2007 || Kitt Peak || Spacewatch ||  || align=right | 2.7 km || 
|-id=584 bgcolor=#d6d6d6
| 516584 ||  || — || March 14, 2007 || Kitt Peak || Spacewatch ||  || align=right | 2.1 km || 
|-id=585 bgcolor=#d6d6d6
| 516585 ||  || — || March 11, 2007 || Mount Lemmon || Mount Lemmon Survey ||  || align=right | 2.3 km || 
|-id=586 bgcolor=#fefefe
| 516586 ||  || — || March 20, 2007 || Kitt Peak || Spacewatch || MAS || align=right data-sort-value="0.54" | 540 m || 
|-id=587 bgcolor=#d6d6d6
| 516587 ||  || — || March 14, 2007 || Mount Lemmon || Mount Lemmon Survey ||  || align=right | 2.4 km || 
|-id=588 bgcolor=#fefefe
| 516588 ||  || — || March 18, 2007 || Kitt Peak || Spacewatch || H || align=right data-sort-value="0.51" | 510 m || 
|-id=589 bgcolor=#fefefe
| 516589 ||  || — || March 20, 2007 || Kitt Peak || Spacewatch || NYS || align=right data-sort-value="0.52" | 520 m || 
|-id=590 bgcolor=#fefefe
| 516590 ||  || — || April 14, 2007 || Kitt Peak || Spacewatch ||  || align=right data-sort-value="0.68" | 680 m || 
|-id=591 bgcolor=#fefefe
| 516591 ||  || — || April 15, 2007 || Kitt Peak || Spacewatch ||  || align=right data-sort-value="0.68" | 680 m || 
|-id=592 bgcolor=#d6d6d6
| 516592 ||  || — || March 15, 2007 || Mount Lemmon || Mount Lemmon Survey ||  || align=right | 2.8 km || 
|-id=593 bgcolor=#d6d6d6
| 516593 ||  || — || April 11, 2007 || Mount Lemmon || Mount Lemmon Survey ||  || align=right | 2.5 km || 
|-id=594 bgcolor=#fefefe
| 516594 ||  || — || April 22, 2007 || Mount Lemmon || Mount Lemmon Survey ||  || align=right data-sort-value="0.77" | 770 m || 
|-id=595 bgcolor=#fefefe
| 516595 ||  || — || April 22, 2007 || Kitt Peak || Spacewatch || MAS || align=right data-sort-value="0.71" | 710 m || 
|-id=596 bgcolor=#fefefe
| 516596 ||  || — || March 15, 2007 || Mount Lemmon || Mount Lemmon Survey ||  || align=right data-sort-value="0.73" | 730 m || 
|-id=597 bgcolor=#fefefe
| 516597 ||  || — || April 11, 2007 || Mount Lemmon || Mount Lemmon Survey ||  || align=right data-sort-value="0.60" | 600 m || 
|-id=598 bgcolor=#fefefe
| 516598 ||  || — || April 24, 2007 || Kitt Peak || Spacewatch ||  || align=right data-sort-value="0.86" | 860 m || 
|-id=599 bgcolor=#d6d6d6
| 516599 ||  || — || April 20, 2007 || Mount Lemmon || Mount Lemmon Survey ||  || align=right | 3.8 km || 
|-id=600 bgcolor=#fefefe
| 516600 ||  || — || May 9, 2007 || Mount Lemmon || Mount Lemmon Survey || MAS || align=right data-sort-value="0.62" | 620 m || 
|}

516601–516700 

|-bgcolor=#fefefe
| 516601 ||  || — || May 9, 2007 || Kitt Peak || Spacewatch ||  || align=right data-sort-value="0.70" | 700 m || 
|-id=602 bgcolor=#fefefe
| 516602 ||  || — || April 25, 2007 || Mount Lemmon || Mount Lemmon Survey ||  || align=right data-sort-value="0.96" | 960 m || 
|-id=603 bgcolor=#fefefe
| 516603 ||  || — || April 22, 2007 || Mount Lemmon || Mount Lemmon Survey || H || align=right data-sort-value="0.78" | 780 m || 
|-id=604 bgcolor=#C2FFFF
| 516604 ||  || — || May 10, 2007 || Kitt Peak || Spacewatch || L5 || align=right | 9.0 km || 
|-id=605 bgcolor=#d6d6d6
| 516605 ||  || — || May 18, 2007 || Bergisch Gladbach || W. Bickel ||  || align=right | 2.6 km || 
|-id=606 bgcolor=#d6d6d6
| 516606 ||  || — || April 24, 2007 || Mount Lemmon || Mount Lemmon Survey || THB || align=right | 1.9 km || 
|-id=607 bgcolor=#d6d6d6
| 516607 ||  || — || June 13, 2007 || Kitt Peak || Spacewatch ||  || align=right | 2.5 km || 
|-id=608 bgcolor=#d6d6d6
| 516608 ||  || — || May 19, 2007 || Catalina || CSS || Tj (2.96) || align=right | 4.1 km || 
|-id=609 bgcolor=#E9E9E9
| 516609 ||  || — || July 18, 2007 || Mount Lemmon || Mount Lemmon Survey ||  || align=right data-sort-value="0.92" | 920 m || 
|-id=610 bgcolor=#E9E9E9
| 516610 ||  || — || September 10, 2007 || Mount Lemmon || Mount Lemmon Survey || RAF || align=right data-sort-value="0.80" | 800 m || 
|-id=611 bgcolor=#E9E9E9
| 516611 ||  || — || September 13, 2007 || Kitt Peak || Spacewatch ||  || align=right data-sort-value="0.94" | 940 m || 
|-id=612 bgcolor=#E9E9E9
| 516612 ||  || — || September 18, 2007 || Mount Lemmon || Mount Lemmon Survey ||  || align=right | 1.8 km || 
|-id=613 bgcolor=#E9E9E9
| 516613 ||  || — || September 17, 2007 || XuYi || PMO NEO ||  || align=right | 1.5 km || 
|-id=614 bgcolor=#E9E9E9
| 516614 ||  || — || October 14, 2007 || Mount Lemmon || Mount Lemmon Survey || DOR || align=right | 2.3 km || 
|-id=615 bgcolor=#E9E9E9
| 516615 ||  || — || October 12, 2007 || Mount Lemmon || Mount Lemmon Survey ||  || align=right | 1.5 km || 
|-id=616 bgcolor=#E9E9E9
| 516616 ||  || — || September 25, 2007 || Mount Lemmon || Mount Lemmon Survey ||  || align=right | 1.3 km || 
|-id=617 bgcolor=#E9E9E9
| 516617 ||  || — || October 10, 2007 || Catalina || CSS ||  || align=right | 1.8 km || 
|-id=618 bgcolor=#E9E9E9
| 516618 ||  || — || October 10, 2007 || Kitt Peak || Spacewatch ||  || align=right | 1.3 km || 
|-id=619 bgcolor=#E9E9E9
| 516619 ||  || — || September 20, 2007 || Kitt Peak || Spacewatch ||  || align=right | 1.2 km || 
|-id=620 bgcolor=#E9E9E9
| 516620 ||  || — || November 5, 2007 || Kitt Peak || Spacewatch ||  || align=right | 1.8 km || 
|-id=621 bgcolor=#E9E9E9
| 516621 ||  || — || December 4, 2007 || Kitt Peak || Spacewatch ||  || align=right | 1.9 km || 
|-id=622 bgcolor=#fefefe
| 516622 ||  || — || December 30, 2007 || Kitt Peak || Spacewatch ||  || align=right data-sort-value="0.53" | 530 m || 
|-id=623 bgcolor=#E9E9E9
| 516623 ||  || — || December 30, 2007 || Kitt Peak || Spacewatch || GEF || align=right | 1.0 km || 
|-id=624 bgcolor=#E9E9E9
| 516624 ||  || — || January 31, 2008 || Mount Lemmon || Mount Lemmon Survey ||  || align=right | 2.5 km || 
|-id=625 bgcolor=#d6d6d6
| 516625 ||  || — || January 31, 2008 || Mount Lemmon || Mount Lemmon Survey ||  || align=right | 2.2 km || 
|-id=626 bgcolor=#d6d6d6
| 516626 ||  || — || February 9, 2008 || Mount Lemmon || Mount Lemmon Survey ||  || align=right | 2.3 km || 
|-id=627 bgcolor=#fefefe
| 516627 ||  || — || February 8, 2008 || Kitt Peak || Spacewatch ||  || align=right data-sort-value="0.47" | 470 m || 
|-id=628 bgcolor=#d6d6d6
| 516628 ||  || — || February 9, 2008 || Kitt Peak || Spacewatch ||  || align=right | 1.9 km || 
|-id=629 bgcolor=#E9E9E9
| 516629 ||  || — || February 12, 2008 || Mount Lemmon || Mount Lemmon Survey ||  || align=right | 1.8 km || 
|-id=630 bgcolor=#E9E9E9
| 516630 ||  || — || February 26, 2008 || Kitt Peak || Spacewatch ||  || align=right | 2.2 km || 
|-id=631 bgcolor=#E9E9E9
| 516631 ||  || — || January 11, 2008 || Kitt Peak || Spacewatch ||  || align=right | 2.1 km || 
|-id=632 bgcolor=#fefefe
| 516632 ||  || — || March 4, 2008 || Mount Lemmon || Mount Lemmon Survey ||  || align=right data-sort-value="0.69" | 690 m || 
|-id=633 bgcolor=#E9E9E9
| 516633 ||  || — || February 12, 2008 || Kitt Peak || Spacewatch ||  || align=right | 2.1 km || 
|-id=634 bgcolor=#d6d6d6
| 516634 ||  || — || March 1, 2008 || Kitt Peak || Spacewatch ||  || align=right | 1.9 km || 
|-id=635 bgcolor=#fefefe
| 516635 ||  || — || March 13, 2008 || Mount Lemmon || Mount Lemmon Survey || H || align=right data-sort-value="0.59" | 590 m || 
|-id=636 bgcolor=#fefefe
| 516636 ||  || — || March 29, 2008 || Kitt Peak || Spacewatch ||  || align=right data-sort-value="0.61" | 610 m || 
|-id=637 bgcolor=#d6d6d6
| 516637 ||  || — || March 30, 2008 || Kitt Peak || Spacewatch ||  || align=right | 2.1 km || 
|-id=638 bgcolor=#d6d6d6
| 516638 ||  || — || March 27, 2008 || Mount Lemmon || Mount Lemmon Survey || KOR || align=right data-sort-value="0.91" | 910 m || 
|-id=639 bgcolor=#fefefe
| 516639 ||  || — || April 3, 2008 || Mount Lemmon || Mount Lemmon Survey ||  || align=right data-sort-value="0.47" | 470 m || 
|-id=640 bgcolor=#d6d6d6
| 516640 ||  || — || April 8, 2008 || Kitt Peak || Spacewatch ||  || align=right | 1.8 km || 
|-id=641 bgcolor=#FFC2E0
| 516641 ||  || — || April 14, 2008 || Socorro || LINEAR || AMOcritical || align=right data-sort-value="0.41" | 410 m || 
|-id=642 bgcolor=#d6d6d6
| 516642 ||  || — || April 6, 2008 || Kitt Peak || Spacewatch || EOS || align=right | 1.6 km || 
|-id=643 bgcolor=#fefefe
| 516643 ||  || — || April 4, 2008 || Mount Lemmon || Mount Lemmon Survey ||  || align=right data-sort-value="0.86" | 860 m || 
|-id=644 bgcolor=#fefefe
| 516644 ||  || — || April 4, 2008 || Kitt Peak || Spacewatch ||  || align=right data-sort-value="0.73" | 730 m || 
|-id=645 bgcolor=#fefefe
| 516645 ||  || — || April 24, 2008 || Kitt Peak || Spacewatch ||  || align=right data-sort-value="0.68" | 680 m || 
|-id=646 bgcolor=#fefefe
| 516646 ||  || — || October 21, 2006 || Kitt Peak || Spacewatch ||  || align=right data-sort-value="0.70" | 700 m || 
|-id=647 bgcolor=#FA8072
| 516647 ||  || — || April 4, 2008 || Kitt Peak || Spacewatch ||  || align=right data-sort-value="0.60" | 600 m || 
|-id=648 bgcolor=#fefefe
| 516648 ||  || — || April 29, 2008 || Kitt Peak || Spacewatch || (2076) || align=right data-sort-value="0.66" | 660 m || 
|-id=649 bgcolor=#fefefe
| 516649 ||  || — || April 5, 2008 || Kitt Peak || Spacewatch ||  || align=right data-sort-value="0.75" | 750 m || 
|-id=650 bgcolor=#d6d6d6
| 516650 ||  || — || May 11, 2008 || Kitt Peak || Spacewatch ||  || align=right | 2.6 km || 
|-id=651 bgcolor=#d6d6d6
| 516651 ||  || — || May 26, 2008 || Kitt Peak || Spacewatch ||  || align=right | 3.5 km || 
|-id=652 bgcolor=#fefefe
| 516652 ||  || — || April 30, 2008 || Mount Lemmon || Mount Lemmon Survey ||  || align=right data-sort-value="0.55" | 550 m || 
|-id=653 bgcolor=#fefefe
| 516653 ||  || — || May 28, 2008 || Mount Lemmon || Mount Lemmon Survey ||  || align=right data-sort-value="0.67" | 670 m || 
|-id=654 bgcolor=#fefefe
| 516654 ||  || — || July 3, 2008 || Siding Spring || SSS ||  || align=right data-sort-value="0.77" | 770 m || 
|-id=655 bgcolor=#d6d6d6
| 516655 ||  || — || July 3, 2008 || Catalina || CSS ||  || align=right | 2.7 km || 
|-id=656 bgcolor=#d6d6d6
| 516656 ||  || — || July 30, 2008 || Mount Lemmon || Mount Lemmon Survey ||  || align=right | 2.9 km || 
|-id=657 bgcolor=#E9E9E9
| 516657 ||  || — || July 28, 2008 || Mount Lemmon || Mount Lemmon Survey ||  || align=right | 1.9 km || 
|-id=658 bgcolor=#fefefe
| 516658 ||  || — || September 3, 2008 || La Sagra || OAM Obs. || H || align=right data-sort-value="0.65" | 650 m || 
|-id=659 bgcolor=#fefefe
| 516659 ||  || — || September 2, 2008 || Kitt Peak || Spacewatch ||  || align=right data-sort-value="0.66" | 660 m || 
|-id=660 bgcolor=#E9E9E9
| 516660 ||  || — || September 9, 2008 || Mount Lemmon || Mount Lemmon Survey ||  || align=right data-sort-value="0.94" | 940 m || 
|-id=661 bgcolor=#fefefe
| 516661 ||  || — || September 6, 2008 || Kitt Peak || Spacewatch || NYS || align=right data-sort-value="0.72" | 720 m || 
|-id=662 bgcolor=#E9E9E9
| 516662 ||  || — || September 19, 2008 || Kitt Peak || Spacewatch ||  || align=right | 1.2 km || 
|-id=663 bgcolor=#fefefe
| 516663 ||  || — || September 20, 2008 || Kitt Peak || Spacewatch ||  || align=right data-sort-value="0.86" | 860 m || 
|-id=664 bgcolor=#fefefe
| 516664 ||  || — || September 21, 2008 || Kitt Peak || Spacewatch ||  || align=right data-sort-value="0.89" | 890 m || 
|-id=665 bgcolor=#fefefe
| 516665 ||  || — || September 21, 2008 || Catalina || CSS ||  || align=right data-sort-value="0.78" | 780 m || 
|-id=666 bgcolor=#E9E9E9
| 516666 ||  || — || September 23, 2008 || Mount Lemmon || Mount Lemmon Survey ||  || align=right | 2.2 km || 
|-id=667 bgcolor=#fefefe
| 516667 ||  || — || September 21, 2008 || Kitt Peak || Spacewatch ||  || align=right data-sort-value="0.65" | 650 m || 
|-id=668 bgcolor=#d6d6d6
| 516668 ||  || — || September 22, 2008 || Mount Lemmon || Mount Lemmon Survey || Tj (2.99) || align=right | 3.1 km || 
|-id=669 bgcolor=#fefefe
| 516669 ||  || — || September 24, 2008 || Kitt Peak || Spacewatch ||  || align=right data-sort-value="0.89" | 890 m || 
|-id=670 bgcolor=#fefefe
| 516670 ||  || — || September 24, 2008 || Mount Lemmon || Mount Lemmon Survey ||  || align=right data-sort-value="0.82" | 820 m || 
|-id=671 bgcolor=#E9E9E9
| 516671 ||  || — || September 22, 2008 || Mount Lemmon || Mount Lemmon Survey ||  || align=right | 1.4 km || 
|-id=672 bgcolor=#fefefe
| 516672 ||  || — || September 22, 2008 || Kitt Peak || Spacewatch || MAS || align=right data-sort-value="0.61" | 610 m || 
|-id=673 bgcolor=#fefefe
| 516673 ||  || — || September 21, 2008 || Kitt Peak || Spacewatch ||  || align=right data-sort-value="0.94" | 940 m || 
|-id=674 bgcolor=#fefefe
| 516674 ||  || — || September 24, 2008 || Mount Lemmon || Mount Lemmon Survey ||  || align=right data-sort-value="0.72" | 720 m || 
|-id=675 bgcolor=#E9E9E9
| 516675 ||  || — || September 23, 2008 || Mount Lemmon || Mount Lemmon Survey ||  || align=right | 1.6 km || 
|-id=676 bgcolor=#E9E9E9
| 516676 ||  || — || September 23, 2008 || Mount Lemmon || Mount Lemmon Survey ||  || align=right data-sort-value="0.85" | 850 m || 
|-id=677 bgcolor=#E9E9E9
| 516677 ||  || — || September 24, 2008 || Mount Lemmon || Mount Lemmon Survey ||  || align=right | 2.0 km || 
|-id=678 bgcolor=#E9E9E9
| 516678 ||  || — || September 24, 2008 || Mount Lemmon || Mount Lemmon Survey ||  || align=right | 2.0 km || 
|-id=679 bgcolor=#E9E9E9
| 516679 ||  || — || September 24, 2008 || Mount Lemmon || Mount Lemmon Survey ||  || align=right | 1.4 km || 
|-id=680 bgcolor=#E9E9E9
| 516680 ||  || — || August 24, 2008 || Kitt Peak || Spacewatch ||  || align=right | 2.3 km || 
|-id=681 bgcolor=#E9E9E9
| 516681 ||  || — || September 27, 2008 || Mount Lemmon || Mount Lemmon Survey ||  || align=right | 1.0 km || 
|-id=682 bgcolor=#E9E9E9
| 516682 ||  || — || September 21, 2008 || Kitt Peak || Spacewatch ||  || align=right | 1.8 km || 
|-id=683 bgcolor=#fefefe
| 516683 ||  || — || October 3, 2008 || Kitt Peak || Spacewatch || H || align=right data-sort-value="0.47" | 470 m || 
|-id=684 bgcolor=#fefefe
| 516684 ||  || — || October 6, 2008 || Kitt Peak || Spacewatch || CLA || align=right | 1.5 km || 
|-id=685 bgcolor=#d6d6d6
| 516685 ||  || — || September 28, 2008 || Mount Lemmon || Mount Lemmon Survey || 7:4 || align=right | 3.1 km || 
|-id=686 bgcolor=#fefefe
| 516686 ||  || — || October 8, 2008 || Kitt Peak || Spacewatch ||  || align=right data-sort-value="0.94" | 940 m || 
|-id=687 bgcolor=#E9E9E9
| 516687 ||  || — || October 2, 2008 || Mount Lemmon || Mount Lemmon Survey ||  || align=right | 1.3 km || 
|-id=688 bgcolor=#E9E9E9
| 516688 ||  || — || October 6, 2008 || Mount Lemmon || Mount Lemmon Survey ||  || align=right | 1.3 km || 
|-id=689 bgcolor=#d6d6d6
| 516689 ||  || — || October 10, 2008 || Mount Lemmon || Mount Lemmon Survey ||  || align=right | 2.9 km || 
|-id=690 bgcolor=#fefefe
| 516690 ||  || — || October 23, 2008 || Kitt Peak || Spacewatch ||  || align=right data-sort-value="0.75" | 750 m || 
|-id=691 bgcolor=#fefefe
| 516691 ||  || — || October 23, 2008 || Kitt Peak || Spacewatch || MAS || align=right data-sort-value="0.59" | 590 m || 
|-id=692 bgcolor=#d6d6d6
| 516692 ||  || — || September 23, 2008 || Kitt Peak || Spacewatch || 7:4* || align=right | 2.5 km || 
|-id=693 bgcolor=#fefefe
| 516693 ||  || — || October 24, 2008 || Kitt Peak || Spacewatch || MAS || align=right data-sort-value="0.65" | 650 m || 
|-id=694 bgcolor=#fefefe
| 516694 ||  || — || October 24, 2008 || Kitt Peak || Spacewatch ||  || align=right data-sort-value="0.75" | 750 m || 
|-id=695 bgcolor=#fefefe
| 516695 ||  || — || September 30, 2008 || Catalina || CSS || H || align=right data-sort-value="0.60" | 600 m || 
|-id=696 bgcolor=#fefefe
| 516696 ||  || — || September 29, 2008 || Mount Lemmon || Mount Lemmon Survey || H || align=right data-sort-value="0.65" | 650 m || 
|-id=697 bgcolor=#fefefe
| 516697 ||  || — || October 24, 2008 || Kitt Peak || Spacewatch ||  || align=right data-sort-value="0.84" | 840 m || 
|-id=698 bgcolor=#E9E9E9
| 516698 ||  || — || October 25, 2008 || Mount Lemmon || Mount Lemmon Survey ||  || align=right data-sort-value="0.75" | 750 m || 
|-id=699 bgcolor=#E9E9E9
| 516699 ||  || — || April 2, 2006 || Kitt Peak || Spacewatch ||  || align=right | 2.2 km || 
|-id=700 bgcolor=#fefefe
| 516700 ||  || — || November 1, 2008 || Mount Lemmon || Mount Lemmon Survey ||  || align=right data-sort-value="0.87" | 870 m || 
|}

516701–516800 

|-bgcolor=#fefefe
| 516701 ||  || — || October 6, 2008 || Mount Lemmon || Mount Lemmon Survey || H || align=right data-sort-value="0.51" | 510 m || 
|-id=702 bgcolor=#fefefe
| 516702 ||  || — || November 2, 2008 || Mount Lemmon || Mount Lemmon Survey || H || align=right data-sort-value="0.75" | 750 m || 
|-id=703 bgcolor=#d6d6d6
| 516703 ||  || — || October 3, 2008 || Mount Lemmon || Mount Lemmon Survey ||  || align=right | 2.3 km || 
|-id=704 bgcolor=#d6d6d6
| 516704 ||  || — || November 6, 2008 || Mount Lemmon || Mount Lemmon Survey ||  || align=right | 2.3 km || 
|-id=705 bgcolor=#d6d6d6
| 516705 ||  || — || November 7, 2008 || Mount Lemmon || Mount Lemmon Survey ||  || align=right | 2.2 km || 
|-id=706 bgcolor=#E9E9E9
| 516706 ||  || — || November 21, 2008 || Kitt Peak || Spacewatch ||  || align=right | 1.9 km || 
|-id=707 bgcolor=#E9E9E9
| 516707 ||  || — || November 9, 2008 || Mount Lemmon || Mount Lemmon Survey ||  || align=right data-sort-value="0.90" | 900 m || 
|-id=708 bgcolor=#d6d6d6
| 516708 ||  || — || October 9, 2008 || Mount Lemmon || Mount Lemmon Survey ||  || align=right | 2.5 km || 
|-id=709 bgcolor=#E9E9E9
| 516709 ||  || — || December 30, 2008 || Mount Lemmon || Mount Lemmon Survey || MAR || align=right data-sort-value="0.93" | 930 m || 
|-id=710 bgcolor=#E9E9E9
| 516710 ||  || — || December 22, 2008 || Kitt Peak || Spacewatch ||  || align=right | 1.4 km || 
|-id=711 bgcolor=#E9E9E9
| 516711 ||  || — || December 30, 2008 || Kitt Peak || Spacewatch ||  || align=right data-sort-value="0.94" | 940 m || 
|-id=712 bgcolor=#d6d6d6
| 516712 ||  || — || December 22, 2008 || Mount Lemmon || Mount Lemmon Survey ||  || align=right | 2.6 km || 
|-id=713 bgcolor=#E9E9E9
| 516713 ||  || — || December 21, 2008 || Kitt Peak || Spacewatch ||  || align=right | 1.1 km || 
|-id=714 bgcolor=#E9E9E9
| 516714 ||  || — || December 4, 2008 || Kitt Peak || Spacewatch ||  || align=right | 1.3 km || 
|-id=715 bgcolor=#E9E9E9
| 516715 ||  || — || January 15, 2009 || Kitt Peak || Spacewatch || MIS || align=right | 2.3 km || 
|-id=716 bgcolor=#E9E9E9
| 516716 ||  || — || January 1, 2009 || Kitt Peak || Spacewatch || EUN || align=right data-sort-value="0.95" | 950 m || 
|-id=717 bgcolor=#E9E9E9
| 516717 ||  || — || November 23, 2008 || Catalina || CSS || MAR || align=right | 1.2 km || 
|-id=718 bgcolor=#E9E9E9
| 516718 ||  || — || January 16, 2009 || Kitt Peak || Spacewatch || MIS || align=right | 2.2 km || 
|-id=719 bgcolor=#E9E9E9
| 516719 ||  || — || January 20, 2009 || Kitt Peak || Spacewatch ||  || align=right | 1.3 km || 
|-id=720 bgcolor=#E9E9E9
| 516720 ||  || — || January 28, 2009 || Catalina || CSS ||  || align=right | 1.3 km || 
|-id=721 bgcolor=#E9E9E9
| 516721 ||  || — || December 31, 2008 || Mount Lemmon || Mount Lemmon Survey ||  || align=right | 1.5 km || 
|-id=722 bgcolor=#E9E9E9
| 516722 ||  || — || March 11, 2005 || Mount Lemmon || Mount Lemmon Survey ||  || align=right | 1.2 km || 
|-id=723 bgcolor=#E9E9E9
| 516723 ||  || — || January 30, 2009 || Kitt Peak || Spacewatch ||  || align=right | 1.4 km || 
|-id=724 bgcolor=#E9E9E9
| 516724 ||  || — || January 18, 2009 || Kitt Peak || Spacewatch ||  || align=right | 1.1 km || 
|-id=725 bgcolor=#d6d6d6
| 516725 ||  || — || February 20, 2009 || Kitt Peak || Spacewatch || Tj (2.35) || align=right | 4.8 km || 
|-id=726 bgcolor=#E9E9E9
| 516726 ||  || — || January 19, 2009 || Mount Lemmon || Mount Lemmon Survey ||  || align=right | 1.3 km || 
|-id=727 bgcolor=#E9E9E9
| 516727 ||  || — || February 27, 2009 || Kitt Peak || Spacewatch ||  || align=right | 1.9 km || 
|-id=728 bgcolor=#E9E9E9
| 516728 ||  || — || February 22, 2009 || Kitt Peak || Spacewatch ||  || align=right | 1.5 km || 
|-id=729 bgcolor=#E9E9E9
| 516729 ||  || — || February 27, 2009 || Kitt Peak || Spacewatch || 526 || align=right | 1.8 km || 
|-id=730 bgcolor=#E9E9E9
| 516730 ||  || — || February 20, 2009 || Catalina || CSS ||  || align=right | 1.5 km || 
|-id=731 bgcolor=#d6d6d6
| 516731 ||  || — || February 26, 2009 || Kitt Peak || Spacewatch || 3:2 || align=right | 4.1 km || 
|-id=732 bgcolor=#E9E9E9
| 516732 ||  || — || March 1, 2009 || Mount Lemmon || Mount Lemmon Survey ||  || align=right | 1.3 km || 
|-id=733 bgcolor=#E9E9E9
| 516733 ||  || — || January 19, 2009 || Mount Lemmon || Mount Lemmon Survey ||  || align=right | 1.3 km || 
|-id=734 bgcolor=#FFC2E0
| 516734 ||  || — || March 17, 2009 || Socorro || LINEAR || APO || align=right data-sort-value="0.59" | 590 m || 
|-id=735 bgcolor=#E9E9E9
| 516735 ||  || — || March 15, 2009 || Kitt Peak || Spacewatch ||  || align=right | 1.5 km || 
|-id=736 bgcolor=#E9E9E9
| 516736 ||  || — || March 17, 2009 || Kitt Peak || Spacewatch ||  || align=right | 2.2 km || 
|-id=737 bgcolor=#E9E9E9
| 516737 ||  || — || April 2, 2009 || Kitt Peak || Spacewatch ||  || align=right | 1.5 km || 
|-id=738 bgcolor=#E9E9E9
| 516738 ||  || — || April 17, 2009 || Kitt Peak || Spacewatch ||  || align=right | 2.2 km || 
|-id=739 bgcolor=#E9E9E9
| 516739 ||  || — || March 19, 2009 || Kitt Peak || Spacewatch || MRX || align=right data-sort-value="0.99" | 990 m || 
|-id=740 bgcolor=#E9E9E9
| 516740 ||  || — || April 22, 2009 || Kitt Peak || Spacewatch ||  || align=right | 1.8 km || 
|-id=741 bgcolor=#E9E9E9
| 516741 ||  || — || May 26, 2009 || La Sagra || OAM Obs. ||  || align=right | 2.5 km || 
|-id=742 bgcolor=#d6d6d6
| 516742 ||  || — || August 28, 2009 || Kitt Peak || Spacewatch ||  || align=right | 2.9 km || 
|-id=743 bgcolor=#fefefe
| 516743 ||  || — || August 20, 2009 || La Sagra || OAM Obs. ||  || align=right data-sort-value="0.69" | 690 m || 
|-id=744 bgcolor=#fefefe
| 516744 ||  || — || September 12, 2009 || Kitt Peak || Spacewatch ||  || align=right data-sort-value="0.71" | 710 m || 
|-id=745 bgcolor=#fefefe
| 516745 ||  || — || September 13, 2009 || XuYi || PMO NEO ||  || align=right data-sort-value="0.72" | 720 m || 
|-id=746 bgcolor=#d6d6d6
| 516746 ||  || — || September 13, 2009 || XuYi || PMO NEO || Tj (2.98) || align=right | 4.1 km || 
|-id=747 bgcolor=#fefefe
| 516747 ||  || — || September 15, 2009 || Kitt Peak || Spacewatch ||  || align=right data-sort-value="0.82" | 820 m || 
|-id=748 bgcolor=#d6d6d6
| 516748 ||  || — || September 16, 2009 || Kitt Peak || Spacewatch ||  || align=right | 3.0 km || 
|-id=749 bgcolor=#fefefe
| 516749 ||  || — || September 17, 2009 || Kitt Peak || Spacewatch ||  || align=right data-sort-value="0.62" | 620 m || 
|-id=750 bgcolor=#d6d6d6
| 516750 ||  || — || September 18, 2009 || Kitt Peak || Spacewatch ||  || align=right | 2.6 km || 
|-id=751 bgcolor=#d6d6d6
| 516751 ||  || — || September 18, 2009 || Kitt Peak || Spacewatch || VER || align=right | 2.4 km || 
|-id=752 bgcolor=#fefefe
| 516752 ||  || — || September 10, 2009 || Catalina || CSS ||  || align=right data-sort-value="0.71" | 710 m || 
|-id=753 bgcolor=#fefefe
| 516753 ||  || — || August 29, 2009 || Kitt Peak || Spacewatch ||  || align=right data-sort-value="0.51" | 510 m || 
|-id=754 bgcolor=#fefefe
| 516754 ||  || — || August 29, 2009 || Kitt Peak || Spacewatch ||  || align=right data-sort-value="0.69" | 690 m || 
|-id=755 bgcolor=#fefefe
| 516755 ||  || — || September 23, 2009 || Mount Lemmon || Mount Lemmon Survey ||  || align=right | 1.3 km || 
|-id=756 bgcolor=#d6d6d6
| 516756 ||  || — || September 25, 2009 || Kitt Peak || Spacewatch ||  || align=right | 2.4 km || 
|-id=757 bgcolor=#d6d6d6
| 516757 ||  || — || September 25, 2009 || Kitt Peak || Spacewatch ||  || align=right | 2.2 km || 
|-id=758 bgcolor=#d6d6d6
| 516758 ||  || — || September 18, 2009 || Kitt Peak || Spacewatch || VER || align=right | 2.4 km || 
|-id=759 bgcolor=#d6d6d6
| 516759 ||  || — || September 26, 2009 || Kitt Peak || Spacewatch ||  || align=right | 2.6 km || 
|-id=760 bgcolor=#fefefe
| 516760 ||  || — || September 29, 2009 || Kitt Peak || Spacewatch ||  || align=right data-sort-value="0.58" | 580 m || 
|-id=761 bgcolor=#d6d6d6
| 516761 ||  || — || September 16, 2009 || Catalina || CSS ||  || align=right | 3.3 km || 
|-id=762 bgcolor=#fefefe
| 516762 ||  || — || September 21, 2009 || Mount Lemmon || Mount Lemmon Survey ||  || align=right data-sort-value="0.95" | 950 m || 
|-id=763 bgcolor=#d6d6d6
| 516763 ||  || — || September 20, 2009 || Catalina || CSS || Tj (2.97) || align=right | 5.0 km || 
|-id=764 bgcolor=#fefefe
| 516764 ||  || — || September 30, 2009 || Mount Lemmon || Mount Lemmon Survey ||  || align=right data-sort-value="0.77" | 770 m || 
|-id=765 bgcolor=#fefefe
| 516765 ||  || — || October 15, 2009 || Mount Lemmon || Mount Lemmon Survey ||  || align=right data-sort-value="0.69" | 690 m || 
|-id=766 bgcolor=#d6d6d6
| 516766 ||  || — || March 16, 2007 || Mount Lemmon || Mount Lemmon Survey ||  || align=right | 2.7 km || 
|-id=767 bgcolor=#d6d6d6
| 516767 ||  || — || September 25, 2009 || Kitt Peak || Spacewatch ||  || align=right | 4.6 km || 
|-id=768 bgcolor=#fefefe
| 516768 ||  || — || October 25, 2009 || Kitt Peak || Spacewatch ||  || align=right data-sort-value="0.69" | 690 m || 
|-id=769 bgcolor=#fefefe
| 516769 ||  || — || June 28, 2005 || Kitt Peak || Spacewatch ||  || align=right data-sort-value="0.71" | 710 m || 
|-id=770 bgcolor=#fefefe
| 516770 ||  || — || September 22, 2009 || Mount Lemmon || Mount Lemmon Survey ||  || align=right | 1.6 km || 
|-id=771 bgcolor=#d6d6d6
| 516771 ||  || — || November 11, 2009 || Mount Lemmon || Mount Lemmon Survey ||  || align=right | 2.3 km || 
|-id=772 bgcolor=#d6d6d6
| 516772 ||  || — || October 26, 2009 || Mount Lemmon || Mount Lemmon Survey ||  || align=right | 3.6 km || 
|-id=773 bgcolor=#d6d6d6
| 516773 ||  || — || October 21, 2009 || Mount Lemmon || Mount Lemmon Survey ||  || align=right | 2.9 km || 
|-id=774 bgcolor=#fefefe
| 516774 ||  || — || November 17, 2009 || Kitt Peak || Spacewatch ||  || align=right data-sort-value="0.91" | 910 m || 
|-id=775 bgcolor=#d6d6d6
| 516775 ||  || — || September 19, 2009 || Kitt Peak || Spacewatch ||  || align=right | 2.4 km || 
|-id=776 bgcolor=#fefefe
| 516776 ||  || — || November 20, 2009 || Kitt Peak || Spacewatch ||  || align=right data-sort-value="0.76" | 760 m || 
|-id=777 bgcolor=#fefefe
| 516777 ||  || — || October 8, 2005 || Kitt Peak || Spacewatch ||  || align=right | 1.4 km || 
|-id=778 bgcolor=#fefefe
| 516778 ||  || — || October 16, 2009 || Mount Lemmon || Mount Lemmon Survey ||  || align=right data-sort-value="0.67" | 670 m || 
|-id=779 bgcolor=#fefefe
| 516779 ||  || — || November 10, 2009 || Kitt Peak || Spacewatch || NYS || align=right data-sort-value="0.53" | 530 m || 
|-id=780 bgcolor=#fefefe
| 516780 ||  || — || November 24, 2009 || Kitt Peak || Spacewatch || V || align=right data-sort-value="0.63" | 630 m || 
|-id=781 bgcolor=#d6d6d6
| 516781 ||  || — || February 9, 1999 || Kitt Peak || Spacewatch ||  || align=right | 2.8 km || 
|-id=782 bgcolor=#fefefe
| 516782 ||  || — || December 10, 2009 || La Sagra || OAM Obs. ||  || align=right | 2.3 km || 
|-id=783 bgcolor=#FA8072
| 516783 ||  || — || December 12, 1999 || Socorro || LINEAR ||  || align=right data-sort-value="0.87" | 870 m || 
|-id=784 bgcolor=#fefefe
| 516784 ||  || — || November 4, 2005 || Mount Lemmon || Mount Lemmon Survey ||  || align=right data-sort-value="0.71" | 710 m || 
|-id=785 bgcolor=#fefefe
| 516785 ||  || — || January 7, 2010 || Kitt Peak || Spacewatch ||  || align=right data-sort-value="0.75" | 750 m || 
|-id=786 bgcolor=#d6d6d6
| 516786 ||  || — || October 1, 2009 || Mount Lemmon || Mount Lemmon Survey ||  || align=right | 2.4 km || 
|-id=787 bgcolor=#d6d6d6
| 516787 ||  || — || October 10, 2008 || Mount Lemmon || Mount Lemmon Survey ||  || align=right | 3.0 km || 
|-id=788 bgcolor=#d6d6d6
| 516788 ||  || — || January 29, 2010 || WISE || WISE || Tj (2.97) || align=right | 6.1 km || 
|-id=789 bgcolor=#d6d6d6
| 516789 ||  || — || January 30, 2010 || WISE || WISE ||  || align=right | 4.4 km || 
|-id=790 bgcolor=#d6d6d6
| 516790 ||  || — || March 2, 2001 || Kitt Peak || Spacewatch ||  || align=right | 4.2 km || 
|-id=791 bgcolor=#fefefe
| 516791 ||  || — || March 12, 2010 || Kitt Peak || Spacewatch || H || align=right data-sort-value="0.59" | 590 m || 
|-id=792 bgcolor=#E9E9E9
| 516792 ||  || — || March 13, 2010 || Kitt Peak || Spacewatch ||  || align=right data-sort-value="0.83" | 830 m || 
|-id=793 bgcolor=#fefefe
| 516793 ||  || — || March 21, 2010 || Mount Lemmon || Mount Lemmon Survey || H || align=right data-sort-value="0.58" | 580 m || 
|-id=794 bgcolor=#d6d6d6
| 516794 ||  || — || April 11, 2010 || Mount Lemmon || Mount Lemmon Survey || 3:2 || align=right | 4.2 km || 
|-id=795 bgcolor=#FA8072
| 516795 ||  || — || April 10, 2010 || WISE || WISE ||  || align=right | 1.5 km || 
|-id=796 bgcolor=#E9E9E9
| 516796 ||  || — || April 10, 2010 || Kitt Peak || Spacewatch || ADE || align=right | 1.6 km || 
|-id=797 bgcolor=#E9E9E9
| 516797 ||  || — || April 12, 2010 || Mount Lemmon || Mount Lemmon Survey ||  || align=right data-sort-value="0.99" | 990 m || 
|-id=798 bgcolor=#E9E9E9
| 516798 ||  || — || April 26, 2010 || Mount Lemmon || Mount Lemmon Survey ||  || align=right | 1.9 km || 
|-id=799 bgcolor=#E9E9E9
| 516799 ||  || — || April 9, 2010 || Kitt Peak || Spacewatch || MAR || align=right | 1.0 km || 
|-id=800 bgcolor=#fefefe
| 516800 ||  || — || September 24, 2008 || Mount Lemmon || Mount Lemmon Survey || H || align=right data-sort-value="0.53" | 530 m || 
|}

516801–516900 

|-bgcolor=#E9E9E9
| 516801 ||  || — || May 5, 2010 || Mount Lemmon || Mount Lemmon Survey ||  || align=right | 1.6 km || 
|-id=802 bgcolor=#fefefe
| 516802 ||  || — || March 21, 2010 || Catalina || CSS || H || align=right data-sort-value="0.72" | 720 m || 
|-id=803 bgcolor=#FFC2E0
| 516803 ||  || — || May 14, 2010 || Catalina || CSS || APO || align=right data-sort-value="0.46" | 460 m || 
|-id=804 bgcolor=#E9E9E9
| 516804 ||  || — || May 11, 2010 || Mount Lemmon || Mount Lemmon Survey ||  || align=right | 1.5 km || 
|-id=805 bgcolor=#E9E9E9
| 516805 ||  || — || May 17, 2010 || WISE || WISE ||  || align=right | 1.5 km || 
|-id=806 bgcolor=#E9E9E9
| 516806 ||  || — || May 19, 2010 || WISE || WISE ||  || align=right | 1.2 km || 
|-id=807 bgcolor=#E9E9E9
| 516807 ||  || — || May 28, 2010 || WISE || WISE ||  || align=right | 2.5 km || 
|-id=808 bgcolor=#E9E9E9
| 516808 ||  || — || January 3, 2009 || Mount Lemmon || Mount Lemmon Survey || MAR || align=right data-sort-value="0.88" | 880 m || 
|-id=809 bgcolor=#E9E9E9
| 516809 ||  || — || June 14, 2010 || WISE || WISE ||  || align=right | 1.8 km || 
|-id=810 bgcolor=#E9E9E9
| 516810 ||  || — || June 17, 2010 || WISE || WISE ||  || align=right | 2.1 km || 
|-id=811 bgcolor=#d6d6d6
| 516811 ||  || — || March 8, 2008 || Kitt Peak || Spacewatch || NAE || align=right | 3.5 km || 
|-id=812 bgcolor=#E9E9E9
| 516812 ||  || — || July 4, 2010 || Kitt Peak || Spacewatch ||  || align=right | 1.9 km || 
|-id=813 bgcolor=#E9E9E9
| 516813 ||  || — || July 9, 2010 || WISE || WISE || TIN || align=right | 2.1 km || 
|-id=814 bgcolor=#E9E9E9
| 516814 ||  || — || July 18, 2010 || WISE || WISE ||  || align=right | 1.9 km || 
|-id=815 bgcolor=#d6d6d6
| 516815 ||  || — || July 25, 2010 || WISE || WISE || Tj (2.98) || align=right | 3.2 km || 
|-id=816 bgcolor=#d6d6d6
| 516816 ||  || — || July 26, 2010 || WISE || WISE ||  || align=right | 2.4 km || 
|-id=817 bgcolor=#E9E9E9
| 516817 ||  || — || April 11, 2010 || Mount Lemmon || Mount Lemmon Survey ||  || align=right | 2.6 km || 
|-id=818 bgcolor=#d6d6d6
| 516818 ||  || — || July 28, 2010 || WISE || WISE ||  || align=right | 3.2 km || 
|-id=819 bgcolor=#E9E9E9
| 516819 ||  || — || February 12, 2008 || Mount Lemmon || Mount Lemmon Survey || HOF || align=right | 2.4 km || 
|-id=820 bgcolor=#d6d6d6
| 516820 ||  || — || September 11, 2010 || Kitt Peak || Spacewatch || EOS || align=right | 1.7 km || 
|-id=821 bgcolor=#d6d6d6
| 516821 ||  || — || April 15, 2008 || Mount Lemmon || Mount Lemmon Survey || EOS || align=right | 1.4 km || 
|-id=822 bgcolor=#d6d6d6
| 516822 ||  || — || September 2, 2010 || Mount Lemmon || Mount Lemmon Survey || EOS || align=right | 1.8 km || 
|-id=823 bgcolor=#E9E9E9
| 516823 ||  || — || June 9, 2010 || WISE || WISE ||  || align=right | 2.0 km || 
|-id=824 bgcolor=#d6d6d6
| 516824 ||  || — || October 6, 2005 || Mount Lemmon || Mount Lemmon Survey ||  || align=right | 2.3 km || 
|-id=825 bgcolor=#E9E9E9
| 516825 ||  || — || June 2, 2005 || Siding Spring || SSS || JUN || align=right | 1.2 km || 
|-id=826 bgcolor=#d6d6d6
| 516826 ||  || — || September 29, 2010 || La Sagra || OAM Obs. ||  || align=right | 2.5 km || 
|-id=827 bgcolor=#d6d6d6
| 516827 ||  || — || September 10, 2010 || Kitt Peak || Spacewatch ||  || align=right | 1.9 km || 
|-id=828 bgcolor=#d6d6d6
| 516828 ||  || — || October 19, 2010 || Mount Lemmon || Mount Lemmon Survey ||  || align=right | 2.9 km || 
|-id=829 bgcolor=#d6d6d6
| 516829 ||  || — || October 29, 2010 || Kitt Peak || Spacewatch ||  || align=right | 2.6 km || 
|-id=830 bgcolor=#d6d6d6
| 516830 ||  || — || September 29, 2005 || Mount Lemmon || Mount Lemmon Survey ||  || align=right | 1.7 km || 
|-id=831 bgcolor=#d6d6d6
| 516831 ||  || — || November 2, 2010 || Mount Lemmon || Mount Lemmon Survey ||  || align=right | 3.0 km || 
|-id=832 bgcolor=#d6d6d6
| 516832 ||  || — || September 11, 2010 || Mount Lemmon || Mount Lemmon Survey ||  || align=right | 2.8 km || 
|-id=833 bgcolor=#d6d6d6
| 516833 ||  || — || August 23, 2004 || Kitt Peak || Spacewatch ||  || align=right | 2.6 km || 
|-id=834 bgcolor=#d6d6d6
| 516834 ||  || — || October 30, 2010 || Kitt Peak || Spacewatch ||  || align=right | 2.5 km || 
|-id=835 bgcolor=#d6d6d6
| 516835 ||  || — || November 8, 2010 || Kitt Peak || Spacewatch ||  || align=right | 2.5 km || 
|-id=836 bgcolor=#d6d6d6
| 516836 ||  || — || October 14, 2010 || Mount Lemmon || Mount Lemmon Survey ||  || align=right | 2.7 km || 
|-id=837 bgcolor=#d6d6d6
| 516837 ||  || — || November 10, 2010 || Mount Lemmon || Mount Lemmon Survey ||  || align=right | 3.0 km || 
|-id=838 bgcolor=#d6d6d6
| 516838 ||  || — || November 10, 2010 || Kitt Peak || Spacewatch ||  || align=right | 2.6 km || 
|-id=839 bgcolor=#d6d6d6
| 516839 ||  || — || December 25, 2010 || Mount Lemmon || Mount Lemmon Survey ||  || align=right | 3.8 km || 
|-id=840 bgcolor=#d6d6d6
| 516840 ||  || — || January 9, 2011 || Kitt Peak || Spacewatch ||  || align=right | 3.8 km || 
|-id=841 bgcolor=#fefefe
| 516841 ||  || — || February 7, 2008 || Kitt Peak || Spacewatch ||  || align=right data-sort-value="0.63" | 630 m || 
|-id=842 bgcolor=#fefefe
| 516842 ||  || — || September 19, 2006 || Kitt Peak || Spacewatch ||  || align=right data-sort-value="0.49" | 490 m || 
|-id=843 bgcolor=#fefefe
| 516843 ||  || — || January 26, 2011 || Mount Lemmon || Mount Lemmon Survey ||  || align=right data-sort-value="0.74" | 740 m || 
|-id=844 bgcolor=#fefefe
| 516844 ||  || — || September 21, 2009 || Kitt Peak || Spacewatch ||  || align=right data-sort-value="0.64" | 640 m || 
|-id=845 bgcolor=#fefefe
| 516845 ||  || — || March 28, 2008 || Mount Lemmon || Mount Lemmon Survey ||  || align=right data-sort-value="0.53" | 530 m || 
|-id=846 bgcolor=#d6d6d6
| 516846 ||  || — || January 28, 2011 || Kitt Peak || Spacewatch ||  || align=right | 2.9 km || 
|-id=847 bgcolor=#d6d6d6
| 516847 ||  || — || January 30, 2011 || Haleakala || Pan-STARRS ||  || align=right | 2.3 km || 
|-id=848 bgcolor=#d6d6d6
| 516848 ||  || — || September 7, 2008 || Mount Lemmon || Mount Lemmon Survey ||  || align=right | 2.0 km || 
|-id=849 bgcolor=#E9E9E9
| 516849 ||  || — || January 30, 2011 || Haleakala || Pan-STARRS ||  || align=right | 1.3 km || 
|-id=850 bgcolor=#fefefe
| 516850 ||  || — || February 16, 2001 || Kitt Peak || Spacewatch ||  || align=right data-sort-value="0.62" | 620 m || 
|-id=851 bgcolor=#fefefe
| 516851 ||  || — || April 3, 2008 || Mount Lemmon || Mount Lemmon Survey ||  || align=right data-sort-value="0.57" | 570 m || 
|-id=852 bgcolor=#fefefe
| 516852 ||  || — || February 10, 2008 || Kitt Peak || Spacewatch ||  || align=right data-sort-value="0.62" | 620 m || 
|-id=853 bgcolor=#fefefe
| 516853 ||  || — || September 26, 2009 || Kitt Peak || Spacewatch ||  || align=right data-sort-value="0.63" | 630 m || 
|-id=854 bgcolor=#fefefe
| 516854 ||  || — || May 13, 2008 || Kitt Peak || Spacewatch ||  || align=right data-sort-value="0.63" | 630 m || 
|-id=855 bgcolor=#fefefe
| 516855 ||  || — || March 5, 2011 || Kitt Peak || Spacewatch ||  || align=right data-sort-value="0.63" | 630 m || 
|-id=856 bgcolor=#fefefe
| 516856 ||  || — || February 25, 2011 || Kitt Peak || Spacewatch ||  || align=right data-sort-value="0.67" | 670 m || 
|-id=857 bgcolor=#fefefe
| 516857 ||  || — || October 11, 2009 || Mount Lemmon || Mount Lemmon Survey ||  || align=right data-sort-value="0.80" | 800 m || 
|-id=858 bgcolor=#fefefe
| 516858 ||  || — || March 6, 2011 || Kitt Peak || Spacewatch ||  || align=right data-sort-value="0.49" | 490 m || 
|-id=859 bgcolor=#fefefe
| 516859 ||  || — || March 17, 2004 || Kitt Peak || Spacewatch ||  || align=right data-sort-value="0.56" | 560 m || 
|-id=860 bgcolor=#E9E9E9
| 516860 ||  || — || October 30, 2008 || Mount Lemmon || Mount Lemmon Survey ||  || align=right | 2.5 km || 
|-id=861 bgcolor=#fefefe
| 516861 ||  || — || March 14, 2011 || Mount Lemmon || Mount Lemmon Survey || NYS || align=right data-sort-value="0.52" | 520 m || 
|-id=862 bgcolor=#fefefe
| 516862 ||  || — || February 17, 2004 || Kitt Peak || Spacewatch ||  || align=right data-sort-value="0.65" | 650 m || 
|-id=863 bgcolor=#fefefe
| 516863 ||  || — || March 6, 2011 || Kitt Peak || Spacewatch ||  || align=right data-sort-value="0.64" | 640 m || 
|-id=864 bgcolor=#fefefe
| 516864 ||  || — || February 23, 2011 || Kitt Peak || Spacewatch ||  || align=right data-sort-value="0.74" | 740 m || 
|-id=865 bgcolor=#fefefe
| 516865 ||  || — || March 5, 2011 || Mount Lemmon || Mount Lemmon Survey ||  || align=right data-sort-value="0.62" | 620 m || 
|-id=866 bgcolor=#fefefe
| 516866 ||  || — || January 10, 2007 || Mount Lemmon || Mount Lemmon Survey ||  || align=right data-sort-value="0.53" | 530 m || 
|-id=867 bgcolor=#fefefe
| 516867 ||  || — || April 1, 2011 || Mount Lemmon || Mount Lemmon Survey ||  || align=right data-sort-value="0.78" | 780 m || 
|-id=868 bgcolor=#FFC2E0
| 516868 ||  || — || April 8, 2011 || Socorro || LINEAR || AMOcritical || align=right data-sort-value="0.56" | 560 m || 
|-id=869 bgcolor=#FA8072
| 516869 ||  || — || April 4, 2011 || Kitt Peak || Spacewatch ||  || align=right data-sort-value="0.70" | 700 m || 
|-id=870 bgcolor=#fefefe
| 516870 ||  || — || March 1, 2011 || Mount Lemmon || Mount Lemmon Survey ||  || align=right data-sort-value="0.71" | 710 m || 
|-id=871 bgcolor=#fefefe
| 516871 ||  || — || March 1, 2011 || Mount Lemmon || Mount Lemmon Survey ||  || align=right data-sort-value="0.62" | 620 m || 
|-id=872 bgcolor=#fefefe
| 516872 ||  || — || November 11, 2009 || Mount Lemmon || Mount Lemmon Survey ||  || align=right data-sort-value="0.65" | 650 m || 
|-id=873 bgcolor=#fefefe
| 516873 ||  || — || March 1, 2011 || Mount Lemmon || Mount Lemmon Survey ||  || align=right data-sort-value="0.75" | 750 m || 
|-id=874 bgcolor=#fefefe
| 516874 ||  || — || April 27, 2011 || Kitt Peak || Spacewatch ||  || align=right data-sort-value="0.72" | 720 m || 
|-id=875 bgcolor=#fefefe
| 516875 ||  || — || April 27, 2011 || Haleakala || Pan-STARRS ||  || align=right data-sort-value="0.58" | 580 m || 
|-id=876 bgcolor=#fefefe
| 516876 ||  || — || September 22, 2008 || Kitt Peak || Spacewatch ||  || align=right data-sort-value="0.75" | 750 m || 
|-id=877 bgcolor=#fefefe
| 516877 ||  || — || April 24, 2004 || Kitt Peak || Spacewatch ||  || align=right data-sort-value="0.57" | 570 m || 
|-id=878 bgcolor=#fefefe
| 516878 ||  || — || April 22, 2011 || Kitt Peak || Spacewatch ||  || align=right data-sort-value="0.62" | 620 m || 
|-id=879 bgcolor=#fefefe
| 516879 ||  || — || April 23, 2011 || Kitt Peak || Spacewatch ||  || align=right data-sort-value="0.82" | 820 m || 
|-id=880 bgcolor=#fefefe
| 516880 ||  || — || April 24, 2011 || Mount Lemmon || Mount Lemmon Survey ||  || align=right data-sort-value="0.71" | 710 m || 
|-id=881 bgcolor=#E9E9E9
| 516881 ||  || — || May 12, 2011 || Mount Lemmon || Mount Lemmon Survey ||  || align=right | 2.2 km || 
|-id=882 bgcolor=#fefefe
| 516882 ||  || — || May 23, 2011 || Mount Lemmon || Mount Lemmon Survey || H || align=right data-sort-value="0.71" | 710 m || 
|-id=883 bgcolor=#fefefe
| 516883 ||  || — || February 17, 2007 || Kitt Peak || Spacewatch ||  || align=right data-sort-value="0.74" | 740 m || 
|-id=884 bgcolor=#fefefe
| 516884 ||  || — || March 16, 2007 || Mount Lemmon || Mount Lemmon Survey || MAS || align=right data-sort-value="0.57" | 570 m || 
|-id=885 bgcolor=#E9E9E9
| 516885 ||  || — || May 21, 2011 || Haleakala || Pan-STARRS ||  || align=right data-sort-value="0.76" | 760 m || 
|-id=886 bgcolor=#fefefe
| 516886 ||  || — || October 6, 2008 || Mount Lemmon || Mount Lemmon Survey || NYS || align=right data-sort-value="0.50" | 500 m || 
|-id=887 bgcolor=#fefefe
| 516887 ||  || — || March 25, 2007 || Mount Lemmon || Mount Lemmon Survey ||  || align=right data-sort-value="0.81" | 810 m || 
|-id=888 bgcolor=#fefefe
| 516888 ||  || — || June 27, 2011 || Kitt Peak || Spacewatch ||  || align=right data-sort-value="0.72" | 720 m || 
|-id=889 bgcolor=#fefefe
| 516889 ||  || — || June 26, 2011 || Mount Lemmon || Mount Lemmon Survey ||  || align=right data-sort-value="0.86" | 860 m || 
|-id=890 bgcolor=#fefefe
| 516890 ||  || — || July 22, 2011 || Haleakala || Pan-STARRS ||  || align=right data-sort-value="0.74" | 740 m || 
|-id=891 bgcolor=#fefefe
| 516891 ||  || — || June 22, 2011 || Mount Lemmon || Mount Lemmon Survey ||  || align=right data-sort-value="0.78" | 780 m || 
|-id=892 bgcolor=#fefefe
| 516892 ||  || — || May 29, 2010 || WISE || WISE ||  || align=right | 2.1 km || 
|-id=893 bgcolor=#E9E9E9
| 516893 ||  || — || June 14, 2010 || WISE || WISE ||  || align=right data-sort-value="0.76" | 760 m || 
|-id=894 bgcolor=#E9E9E9
| 516894 ||  || — || September 4, 2011 || Haleakala || Pan-STARRS ||  || align=right | 1.5 km || 
|-id=895 bgcolor=#E9E9E9
| 516895 ||  || — || February 26, 2009 || Kitt Peak || Spacewatch ||  || align=right | 1.7 km || 
|-id=896 bgcolor=#fefefe
| 516896 ||  || — || December 31, 2008 || Mount Lemmon || Mount Lemmon Survey ||  || align=right data-sort-value="0.62" | 620 m || 
|-id=897 bgcolor=#fefefe
| 516897 ||  || — || October 18, 2003 || Kitt Peak || Spacewatch || H || align=right data-sort-value="0.59" | 590 m || 
|-id=898 bgcolor=#fefefe
| 516898 ||  || — || September 24, 2011 || Haleakala || Pan-STARRS || H || align=right data-sort-value="0.59" | 590 m || 
|-id=899 bgcolor=#E9E9E9
| 516899 ||  || — || September 4, 2011 || Haleakala || Pan-STARRS ||  || align=right | 1.5 km || 
|-id=900 bgcolor=#E9E9E9
| 516900 ||  || — || September 22, 2011 || Kitt Peak || Spacewatch ||  || align=right | 1.9 km || 
|}

516901–517000 

|-bgcolor=#fefefe
| 516901 ||  || — || September 12, 2007 || Mount Lemmon || Mount Lemmon Survey ||  || align=right data-sort-value="0.68" | 680 m || 
|-id=902 bgcolor=#fefefe
| 516902 ||  || — || September 2, 2011 || Haleakala || Pan-STARRS || H || align=right data-sort-value="0.38" | 380 m || 
|-id=903 bgcolor=#fefefe
| 516903 ||  || — || September 27, 2011 || Mount Lemmon || Mount Lemmon Survey || H || align=right data-sort-value="0.67" | 670 m || 
|-id=904 bgcolor=#E9E9E9
| 516904 ||  || — || September 27, 2011 || Mount Lemmon || Mount Lemmon Survey || GAL || align=right | 1.4 km || 
|-id=905 bgcolor=#E9E9E9
| 516905 ||  || — || September 30, 2011 || Kitt Peak || Spacewatch ||  || align=right | 1.6 km || 
|-id=906 bgcolor=#E9E9E9
| 516906 ||  || — || November 5, 2007 || Mount Lemmon || Mount Lemmon Survey ||  || align=right | 1.4 km || 
|-id=907 bgcolor=#fefefe
| 516907 ||  || — || December 11, 2006 || Socorro || LINEAR || H || align=right data-sort-value="0.82" | 820 m || 
|-id=908 bgcolor=#E9E9E9
| 516908 ||  || — || October 19, 2011 || Kitt Peak || Spacewatch ||  || align=right data-sort-value="0.95" | 950 m || 
|-id=909 bgcolor=#E9E9E9
| 516909 ||  || — || September 30, 2011 || Kitt Peak || Spacewatch ||  || align=right | 2.0 km || 
|-id=910 bgcolor=#E9E9E9
| 516910 ||  || — || October 20, 2011 || Kitt Peak || Spacewatch ||  || align=right | 1.3 km || 
|-id=911 bgcolor=#E9E9E9
| 516911 ||  || — || November 17, 2007 || Mount Lemmon || Mount Lemmon Survey ||  || align=right data-sort-value="0.91" | 910 m || 
|-id=912 bgcolor=#E9E9E9
| 516912 ||  || — || October 24, 2011 || Haleakala || Pan-STARRS ||  || align=right | 2.1 km || 
|-id=913 bgcolor=#fefefe
| 516913 ||  || — || April 14, 2010 || Mount Lemmon || Mount Lemmon Survey || H || align=right data-sort-value="0.68" | 680 m || 
|-id=914 bgcolor=#E9E9E9
| 516914 ||  || — || October 25, 2011 || Haleakala || Pan-STARRS || WIT || align=right | 1.0 km || 
|-id=915 bgcolor=#d6d6d6
| 516915 ||  || — || September 27, 2011 || Mount Lemmon || Mount Lemmon Survey ||  || align=right | 2.3 km || 
|-id=916 bgcolor=#E9E9E9
| 516916 ||  || — || October 26, 2011 || Haleakala || Pan-STARRS ||  || align=right | 1.4 km || 
|-id=917 bgcolor=#E9E9E9
| 516917 ||  || — || October 26, 2011 || Haleakala || Pan-STARRS ||  || align=right | 1.1 km || 
|-id=918 bgcolor=#d6d6d6
| 516918 ||  || — || October 20, 2006 || Kitt Peak || Spacewatch ||  || align=right | 1.8 km || 
|-id=919 bgcolor=#E9E9E9
| 516919 ||  || — || October 21, 2011 || Mount Lemmon || Mount Lemmon Survey || EUN || align=right | 1.0 km || 
|-id=920 bgcolor=#fefefe
| 516920 ||  || — || September 26, 2011 || Kitt Peak || Spacewatch || H || align=right data-sort-value="0.69" | 690 m || 
|-id=921 bgcolor=#E9E9E9
| 516921 ||  || — || October 19, 2011 || Mount Lemmon || Mount Lemmon Survey ||  || align=right | 1.6 km || 
|-id=922 bgcolor=#E9E9E9
| 516922 ||  || — || September 25, 2011 || Haleakala || Pan-STARRS ||  || align=right data-sort-value="0.98" | 980 m || 
|-id=923 bgcolor=#E9E9E9
| 516923 ||  || — || October 29, 2011 || Haleakala || Pan-STARRS ||  || align=right | 2.3 km || 
|-id=924 bgcolor=#E9E9E9
| 516924 ||  || — || October 25, 2011 || Haleakala || Pan-STARRS ||  || align=right | 1.7 km || 
|-id=925 bgcolor=#d6d6d6
| 516925 ||  || — || December 16, 2006 || Mount Lemmon || Mount Lemmon Survey ||  || align=right | 3.0 km || 
|-id=926 bgcolor=#fefefe
| 516926 ||  || — || November 24, 2008 || Mount Lemmon || Mount Lemmon Survey ||  || align=right data-sort-value="0.65" | 650 m || 
|-id=927 bgcolor=#E9E9E9
| 516927 ||  || — || November 16, 2011 || Kitt Peak || Spacewatch ||  || align=right | 2.2 km || 
|-id=928 bgcolor=#d6d6d6
| 516928 ||  || — || November 24, 2011 || Haleakala || Pan-STARRS ||  || align=right | 2.8 km || 
|-id=929 bgcolor=#fefefe
| 516929 ||  || — || January 15, 2007 || Mount Lemmon || Mount Lemmon Survey || H || align=right data-sort-value="0.72" | 720 m || 
|-id=930 bgcolor=#fefefe
| 516930 ||  || — || November 20, 2011 || Haleakala || Pan-STARRS || H || align=right data-sort-value="0.95" | 950 m || 
|-id=931 bgcolor=#fefefe
| 516931 ||  || — || April 14, 2010 || Mount Lemmon || Mount Lemmon Survey || H || align=right data-sort-value="0.79" | 790 m || 
|-id=932 bgcolor=#d6d6d6
| 516932 ||  || — || December 27, 2011 || Mount Lemmon || Mount Lemmon Survey ||  || align=right | 2.6 km || 
|-id=933 bgcolor=#d6d6d6
| 516933 ||  || — || October 11, 2010 || Mount Lemmon || Mount Lemmon Survey ||  || align=right | 2.2 km || 
|-id=934 bgcolor=#fefefe
| 516934 ||  || — || January 14, 2012 || Haleakala || Pan-STARRS || H || align=right data-sort-value="0.86" | 860 m || 
|-id=935 bgcolor=#d6d6d6
| 516935 ||  || — || June 18, 2010 || WISE || WISE ||  || align=right | 3.8 km || 
|-id=936 bgcolor=#E9E9E9
| 516936 ||  || — || May 17, 2009 || Mount Lemmon || Mount Lemmon Survey ||  || align=right | 1.6 km || 
|-id=937 bgcolor=#d6d6d6
| 516937 ||  || — || July 24, 2010 || WISE || WISE ||  || align=right | 3.7 km || 
|-id=938 bgcolor=#d6d6d6
| 516938 ||  || — || December 28, 2011 || Mount Lemmon || Mount Lemmon Survey ||  || align=right | 3.3 km || 
|-id=939 bgcolor=#d6d6d6
| 516939 ||  || — || January 2, 2012 || Kitt Peak || Spacewatch ||  || align=right | 2.2 km || 
|-id=940 bgcolor=#d6d6d6
| 516940 ||  || — || May 31, 2008 || Kitt Peak || Spacewatch ||  || align=right | 2.7 km || 
|-id=941 bgcolor=#d6d6d6
| 516941 ||  || — || January 21, 2012 || Kitt Peak || Spacewatch ||  || align=right | 2.5 km || 
|-id=942 bgcolor=#d6d6d6
| 516942 ||  || — || November 26, 2011 || Mount Lemmon || Mount Lemmon Survey ||  || align=right | 2.6 km || 
|-id=943 bgcolor=#d6d6d6
| 516943 ||  || — || January 18, 2012 || Kitt Peak || Spacewatch ||  || align=right | 2.4 km || 
|-id=944 bgcolor=#d6d6d6
| 516944 ||  || — || September 10, 2010 || Mount Lemmon || Mount Lemmon Survey ||  || align=right | 2.2 km || 
|-id=945 bgcolor=#d6d6d6
| 516945 ||  || — || December 25, 2005 || Kitt Peak || Spacewatch ||  || align=right | 2.5 km || 
|-id=946 bgcolor=#d6d6d6
| 516946 ||  || — || September 29, 2010 || Mount Lemmon || Mount Lemmon Survey ||  || align=right | 2.0 km || 
|-id=947 bgcolor=#d6d6d6
| 516947 ||  || — || January 27, 2012 || Kitt Peak || Spacewatch ||  || align=right | 2.7 km || 
|-id=948 bgcolor=#d6d6d6
| 516948 ||  || — || November 29, 2005 || Kitt Peak || Spacewatch || TIR || align=right | 2.3 km || 
|-id=949 bgcolor=#d6d6d6
| 516949 ||  || — || January 19, 2012 || Kitt Peak || Spacewatch ||  || align=right | 2.3 km || 
|-id=950 bgcolor=#d6d6d6
| 516950 ||  || — || January 19, 2012 || Haleakala || Pan-STARRS ||  || align=right | 2.7 km || 
|-id=951 bgcolor=#d6d6d6
| 516951 ||  || — || January 20, 2012 || Kitt Peak || Spacewatch ||  || align=right | 2.5 km || 
|-id=952 bgcolor=#d6d6d6
| 516952 ||  || — || February 3, 2012 || Haleakala || Pan-STARRS || EOS || align=right | 1.6 km || 
|-id=953 bgcolor=#d6d6d6
| 516953 ||  || — || January 27, 2012 || Mount Lemmon || Mount Lemmon Survey ||  || align=right | 2.4 km || 
|-id=954 bgcolor=#d6d6d6
| 516954 ||  || — || January 21, 2012 || Kitt Peak || Spacewatch ||  || align=right | 2.3 km || 
|-id=955 bgcolor=#d6d6d6
| 516955 ||  || — || January 19, 2012 || Haleakala || Pan-STARRS ||  || align=right | 2.4 km || 
|-id=956 bgcolor=#d6d6d6
| 516956 ||  || — || October 27, 2005 || Kitt Peak || Spacewatch ||  || align=right | 2.6 km || 
|-id=957 bgcolor=#d6d6d6
| 516957 ||  || — || January 19, 2012 || Haleakala || Pan-STARRS || EOS || align=right | 2.5 km || 
|-id=958 bgcolor=#d6d6d6
| 516958 ||  || — || February 21, 2012 || Kitt Peak || Spacewatch ||  || align=right | 2.6 km || 
|-id=959 bgcolor=#d6d6d6
| 516959 ||  || — || January 19, 2012 || Haleakala || Pan-STARRS ||  || align=right | 3.5 km || 
|-id=960 bgcolor=#d6d6d6
| 516960 ||  || — || February 26, 2012 || Kitt Peak || Spacewatch ||  || align=right | 2.8 km || 
|-id=961 bgcolor=#d6d6d6
| 516961 ||  || — || February 25, 2012 || Kitt Peak || Spacewatch ||  || align=right | 3.0 km || 
|-id=962 bgcolor=#d6d6d6
| 516962 ||  || — || January 25, 2006 || Kitt Peak || Spacewatch ||  || align=right | 2.8 km || 
|-id=963 bgcolor=#d6d6d6
| 516963 ||  || — || August 7, 2010 || WISE || WISE || EUP || align=right | 3.8 km || 
|-id=964 bgcolor=#d6d6d6
| 516964 ||  || — || September 18, 2009 || Mount Lemmon || Mount Lemmon Survey ||  || align=right | 2.1 km || 
|-id=965 bgcolor=#d6d6d6
| 516965 ||  || — || January 19, 2012 || Haleakala || Pan-STARRS ||  || align=right | 2.2 km || 
|-id=966 bgcolor=#d6d6d6
| 516966 ||  || — || September 15, 2009 || Kitt Peak || Spacewatch ||  || align=right | 2.5 km || 
|-id=967 bgcolor=#d6d6d6
| 516967 ||  || — || February 13, 2012 || Haleakala || Pan-STARRS ||  || align=right | 2.9 km || 
|-id=968 bgcolor=#d6d6d6
| 516968 ||  || — || February 23, 2012 || Catalina || CSS ||  || align=right | 3.4 km || 
|-id=969 bgcolor=#d6d6d6
| 516969 ||  || — || February 24, 2012 || Kitt Peak || Spacewatch ||  || align=right | 3.4 km || 
|-id=970 bgcolor=#d6d6d6
| 516970 ||  || — || March 3, 2006 || Kitt Peak || Spacewatch ||  || align=right | 2.6 km || 
|-id=971 bgcolor=#d6d6d6
| 516971 ||  || — || January 22, 2006 || Catalina || CSS ||  || align=right | 3.6 km || 
|-id=972 bgcolor=#E9E9E9
| 516972 ||  || — || March 27, 2012 || Kitt Peak || Spacewatch ||  || align=right | 1.3 km || 
|-id=973 bgcolor=#E9E9E9
| 516973 ||  || — || March 29, 2012 || Kitt Peak || Spacewatch ||  || align=right data-sort-value="0.94" | 940 m || 
|-id=974 bgcolor=#d6d6d6
| 516974 ||  || — || April 15, 2012 || Haleakala || Pan-STARRS ||  || align=right | 3.1 km || 
|-id=975 bgcolor=#d6d6d6
| 516975 ||  || — || April 15, 2012 || Haleakala || Pan-STARRS ||  || align=right | 3.1 km || 
|-id=976 bgcolor=#FFC2E0
| 516976 ||  || — || April 16, 2012 || Haleakala || Pan-STARRS || AMO || align=right data-sort-value="0.19" | 190 m || 
|-id=977 bgcolor=#C2E0FF
| 516977 ||  || — || April 17, 2012 || Las Campanas || New Horizons KBO Search || cubewano? || align=right | 74 km || 
|-id=978 bgcolor=#fefefe
| 516978 ||  || — || May 12, 2012 || Mount Lemmon || Mount Lemmon Survey ||  || align=right data-sort-value="0.75" | 750 m || 
|-id=979 bgcolor=#fefefe
| 516979 ||  || — || September 19, 2003 || Kitt Peak || Spacewatch ||  || align=right data-sort-value="0.47" | 470 m || 
|-id=980 bgcolor=#fefefe
| 516980 ||  || — || April 15, 2012 || Haleakala || Pan-STARRS ||  || align=right data-sort-value="0.70" | 700 m || 
|-id=981 bgcolor=#E9E9E9
| 516981 ||  || — || October 30, 2008 || Mount Lemmon || Mount Lemmon Survey ||  || align=right | 1.6 km || 
|-id=982 bgcolor=#d6d6d6
| 516982 ||  || — || November 7, 2008 || Mount Lemmon || Mount Lemmon Survey ||  || align=right | 3.8 km || 
|-id=983 bgcolor=#fefefe
| 516983 ||  || — || March 1, 2011 || Kitt Peak || Spacewatch ||  || align=right data-sort-value="0.96" | 960 m || 
|-id=984 bgcolor=#FFC2E0
| 516984 ||  || — || July 7, 2010 || WISE || WISE || APO +1km || align=right | 1.8 km || 
|-id=985 bgcolor=#E9E9E9
| 516985 ||  || — || October 3, 2003 || Kitt Peak || Spacewatch ||  || align=right | 1.9 km || 
|-id=986 bgcolor=#FFC2E0
| 516986 ||  || — || July 28, 2005 || Palomar || NEAT || AMO || align=right data-sort-value="0.44" | 440 m || 
|-id=987 bgcolor=#fefefe
| 516987 ||  || — || March 31, 2011 || Haleakala || Pan-STARRS || V || align=right data-sort-value="0.56" | 560 m || 
|-id=988 bgcolor=#fefefe
| 516988 ||  || — || August 26, 2012 || Haleakala || Pan-STARRS ||  || align=right data-sort-value="0.73" | 730 m || 
|-id=989 bgcolor=#E9E9E9
| 516989 ||  || — || November 8, 2008 || Mount Lemmon || Mount Lemmon Survey ||  || align=right | 1.4 km || 
|-id=990 bgcolor=#E9E9E9
| 516990 ||  || — || April 6, 2011 || Kitt Peak || Spacewatch ||  || align=right | 1.4 km || 
|-id=991 bgcolor=#fefefe
| 516991 ||  || — || September 6, 2002 || Socorro || LINEAR ||  || align=right data-sort-value="0.82" | 820 m || 
|-id=992 bgcolor=#fefefe
| 516992 ||  || — || June 19, 1998 || Caussols || ODAS ||  || align=right data-sort-value="0.86" | 860 m || 
|-id=993 bgcolor=#fefefe
| 516993 ||  || — || September 15, 2012 || Catalina || CSS ||  || align=right data-sort-value="0.81" | 810 m || 
|-id=994 bgcolor=#fefefe
| 516994 ||  || — || August 13, 2012 || Kitt Peak || Spacewatch ||  || align=right data-sort-value="0.82" | 820 m || 
|-id=995 bgcolor=#fefefe
| 516995 ||  || — || April 6, 2008 || Kitt Peak || Spacewatch ||  || align=right data-sort-value="0.58" | 580 m || 
|-id=996 bgcolor=#fefefe
| 516996 ||  || — || January 30, 2011 || Haleakala || Pan-STARRS ||  || align=right data-sort-value="0.77" | 770 m || 
|-id=997 bgcolor=#E9E9E9
| 516997 ||  || — || November 1, 2008 || Mount Lemmon || Mount Lemmon Survey ||  || align=right | 1.2 km || 
|-id=998 bgcolor=#fefefe
| 516998 ||  || — || September 25, 2012 || Mount Lemmon || Mount Lemmon Survey ||  || align=right data-sort-value="0.78" | 780 m || 
|-id=999 bgcolor=#fefefe
| 516999 ||  || — || October 15, 2001 || Kitt Peak || Spacewatch ||  || align=right data-sort-value="0.76" | 760 m || 
|-id=000 bgcolor=#fefefe
| 517000 ||  || — || October 4, 2012 || Mount Lemmon || Mount Lemmon Survey ||  || align=right data-sort-value="0.81" | 810 m || 
|}

References

External links 
 Discovery Circumstances: Numbered Minor Planets (515001)–(520000) (IAU Minor Planet Center)

0516